

166001–166100 

|-bgcolor=#fefefe
| 166001 ||  || — || January 9, 2002 || Socorro || LINEAR || — || align=right | 1.3 km || 
|-id=002 bgcolor=#fefefe
| 166002 ||  || — || January 9, 2002 || Socorro || LINEAR || FLO || align=right | 1.2 km || 
|-id=003 bgcolor=#fefefe
| 166003 ||  || — || January 11, 2002 || Socorro || LINEAR || KLI || align=right | 3.8 km || 
|-id=004 bgcolor=#d6d6d6
| 166004 ||  || — || January 14, 2002 || Desert Eagle || W. K. Y. Yeung || ALA || align=right | 6.9 km || 
|-id=005 bgcolor=#fefefe
| 166005 ||  || — || January 8, 2002 || Socorro || LINEAR || FLO || align=right | 1.0 km || 
|-id=006 bgcolor=#fefefe
| 166006 ||  || — || January 13, 2002 || Socorro || LINEAR || — || align=right | 1.2 km || 
|-id=007 bgcolor=#fefefe
| 166007 ||  || — || January 9, 2002 || Socorro || LINEAR || — || align=right | 1.6 km || 
|-id=008 bgcolor=#fefefe
| 166008 ||  || — || January 9, 2002 || Socorro || LINEAR || — || align=right | 1.3 km || 
|-id=009 bgcolor=#fefefe
| 166009 ||  || — || January 9, 2002 || Socorro || LINEAR || — || align=right | 2.2 km || 
|-id=010 bgcolor=#fefefe
| 166010 ||  || — || January 9, 2002 || Socorro || LINEAR || — || align=right | 3.3 km || 
|-id=011 bgcolor=#fefefe
| 166011 ||  || — || January 9, 2002 || Socorro || LINEAR || NYS || align=right | 1.1 km || 
|-id=012 bgcolor=#fefefe
| 166012 ||  || — || January 11, 2002 || Socorro || LINEAR || V || align=right | 1.3 km || 
|-id=013 bgcolor=#fefefe
| 166013 ||  || — || January 13, 2002 || Socorro || LINEAR || — || align=right | 1.1 km || 
|-id=014 bgcolor=#fefefe
| 166014 ||  || — || January 9, 2002 || Socorro || LINEAR || — || align=right | 1.1 km || 
|-id=015 bgcolor=#fefefe
| 166015 ||  || — || January 13, 2002 || Socorro || LINEAR || — || align=right | 1.2 km || 
|-id=016 bgcolor=#fefefe
| 166016 ||  || — || January 13, 2002 || Socorro || LINEAR || NYS || align=right data-sort-value="0.96" | 960 m || 
|-id=017 bgcolor=#fefefe
| 166017 ||  || — || January 14, 2002 || Socorro || LINEAR || NYS || align=right | 1.2 km || 
|-id=018 bgcolor=#fefefe
| 166018 ||  || — || January 14, 2002 || Socorro || LINEAR || — || align=right | 1.4 km || 
|-id=019 bgcolor=#fefefe
| 166019 ||  || — || January 13, 2002 || Socorro || LINEAR || — || align=right | 1.3 km || 
|-id=020 bgcolor=#fefefe
| 166020 ||  || — || January 13, 2002 || Socorro || LINEAR || FLO || align=right | 1.2 km || 
|-id=021 bgcolor=#fefefe
| 166021 ||  || — || January 13, 2002 || Socorro || LINEAR || — || align=right | 1.4 km || 
|-id=022 bgcolor=#fefefe
| 166022 ||  || — || January 13, 2002 || Socorro || LINEAR || — || align=right | 1.2 km || 
|-id=023 bgcolor=#fefefe
| 166023 ||  || — || January 14, 2002 || Socorro || LINEAR || NYS || align=right | 1.1 km || 
|-id=024 bgcolor=#fefefe
| 166024 ||  || — || January 14, 2002 || Socorro || LINEAR || — || align=right | 1.2 km || 
|-id=025 bgcolor=#fefefe
| 166025 ||  || — || January 12, 2002 || Palomar || NEAT || — || align=right | 1.2 km || 
|-id=026 bgcolor=#fefefe
| 166026 ||  || — || January 12, 2002 || Palomar || NEAT || — || align=right | 1.4 km || 
|-id=027 bgcolor=#fefefe
| 166027 ||  || — || January 13, 2002 || Socorro || LINEAR || NYS || align=right | 1.9 km || 
|-id=028 bgcolor=#fefefe
| 166028 Karikókatalin ||  ||  || January 11, 2002 || Piszkéstető || K. Sárneczky, Z. Heiner || — || align=right | 1.4 km || 
|-id=029 bgcolor=#fefefe
| 166029 ||  || — || January 18, 2002 || Socorro || LINEAR || FLO || align=right | 1.2 km || 
|-id=030 bgcolor=#fefefe
| 166030 ||  || — || January 18, 2002 || Socorro || LINEAR || FLO || align=right | 1.3 km || 
|-id=031 bgcolor=#fefefe
| 166031 ||  || — || January 20, 2002 || Kitt Peak || Spacewatch || — || align=right | 1.0 km || 
|-id=032 bgcolor=#fefefe
| 166032 ||  || — || January 19, 2002 || Socorro || LINEAR || FLO || align=right | 2.1 km || 
|-id=033 bgcolor=#fefefe
| 166033 ||  || — || January 19, 2002 || Socorro || LINEAR || — || align=right | 1.6 km || 
|-id=034 bgcolor=#fefefe
| 166034 ||  || — || January 19, 2002 || Socorro || LINEAR || — || align=right | 1.4 km || 
|-id=035 bgcolor=#fefefe
| 166035 ||  || — || January 22, 2002 || Socorro || LINEAR || — || align=right | 1.3 km || 
|-id=036 bgcolor=#fefefe
| 166036 ||  || — || January 23, 2002 || Socorro || LINEAR || V || align=right data-sort-value="0.96" | 960 m || 
|-id=037 bgcolor=#fefefe
| 166037 ||  || — || January 25, 2002 || Palomar || NEAT || — || align=right | 1.5 km || 
|-id=038 bgcolor=#fefefe
| 166038 ||  || — || January 19, 2002 || Socorro || LINEAR || FLO || align=right data-sort-value="0.75" | 750 m || 
|-id=039 bgcolor=#fefefe
| 166039 ||  || — || February 3, 2002 || Palomar || NEAT || — || align=right | 1.4 km || 
|-id=040 bgcolor=#fefefe
| 166040 ||  || — || February 6, 2002 || Desert Eagle || W. K. Y. Yeung || NYS || align=right | 1.1 km || 
|-id=041 bgcolor=#fefefe
| 166041 ||  || — || February 5, 2002 || Anderson Mesa || LONEOS || FLO || align=right | 2.2 km || 
|-id=042 bgcolor=#fefefe
| 166042 ||  || — || February 6, 2002 || Socorro || LINEAR || FLO || align=right | 1.3 km || 
|-id=043 bgcolor=#fefefe
| 166043 ||  || — || February 8, 2002 || Desert Eagle || W. K. Y. Yeung || — || align=right | 1.2 km || 
|-id=044 bgcolor=#FA8072
| 166044 ||  || — || February 7, 2002 || Socorro || LINEAR || — || align=right | 1.6 km || 
|-id=045 bgcolor=#fefefe
| 166045 ||  || — || February 6, 2002 || Socorro || LINEAR || — || align=right | 1.2 km || 
|-id=046 bgcolor=#fefefe
| 166046 ||  || — || February 6, 2002 || Socorro || LINEAR || — || align=right | 2.1 km || 
|-id=047 bgcolor=#fefefe
| 166047 ||  || — || February 4, 2002 || Haleakala || NEAT || — || align=right | 2.8 km || 
|-id=048 bgcolor=#fefefe
| 166048 ||  || — || February 5, 2002 || Palomar || NEAT || — || align=right | 1.4 km || 
|-id=049 bgcolor=#fefefe
| 166049 ||  || — || February 5, 2002 || Palomar || NEAT || — || align=right | 1.0 km || 
|-id=050 bgcolor=#fefefe
| 166050 ||  || — || February 6, 2002 || Socorro || LINEAR || ERI || align=right | 3.6 km || 
|-id=051 bgcolor=#fefefe
| 166051 ||  || — || February 6, 2002 || Socorro || LINEAR || — || align=right | 1.2 km || 
|-id=052 bgcolor=#fefefe
| 166052 ||  || — || February 6, 2002 || Socorro || LINEAR || — || align=right | 2.4 km || 
|-id=053 bgcolor=#fefefe
| 166053 ||  || — || February 11, 2002 || Desert Eagle || W. K. Y. Yeung || — || align=right | 1.5 km || 
|-id=054 bgcolor=#fefefe
| 166054 ||  || — || February 3, 2002 || Haleakala || NEAT || FLO || align=right | 1.3 km || 
|-id=055 bgcolor=#fefefe
| 166055 ||  || — || February 3, 2002 || Haleakala || NEAT || V || align=right | 1.2 km || 
|-id=056 bgcolor=#fefefe
| 166056 ||  || — || February 3, 2002 || Haleakala || NEAT || V || align=right | 1.1 km || 
|-id=057 bgcolor=#fefefe
| 166057 ||  || — || February 12, 2002 || Desert Eagle || W. K. Y. Yeung || NYS || align=right | 1.2 km || 
|-id=058 bgcolor=#fefefe
| 166058 ||  || — || February 12, 2002 || Desert Eagle || W. K. Y. Yeung || NYS || align=right | 1.1 km || 
|-id=059 bgcolor=#fefefe
| 166059 ||  || — || February 7, 2002 || Socorro || LINEAR || — || align=right | 1.1 km || 
|-id=060 bgcolor=#E9E9E9
| 166060 ||  || — || February 7, 2002 || Socorro || LINEAR || — || align=right | 2.1 km || 
|-id=061 bgcolor=#fefefe
| 166061 ||  || — || February 7, 2002 || Socorro || LINEAR || NYS || align=right | 1.1 km || 
|-id=062 bgcolor=#fefefe
| 166062 ||  || — || February 6, 2002 || Socorro || LINEAR || — || align=right | 1.4 km || 
|-id=063 bgcolor=#fefefe
| 166063 ||  || — || February 6, 2002 || Socorro || LINEAR || — || align=right | 1.5 km || 
|-id=064 bgcolor=#fefefe
| 166064 ||  || — || February 6, 2002 || Socorro || LINEAR || — || align=right | 1.4 km || 
|-id=065 bgcolor=#fefefe
| 166065 ||  || — || February 7, 2002 || Socorro || LINEAR || MAS || align=right | 1.2 km || 
|-id=066 bgcolor=#fefefe
| 166066 ||  || — || February 7, 2002 || Socorro || LINEAR || NYS || align=right | 1.9 km || 
|-id=067 bgcolor=#fefefe
| 166067 ||  || — || February 7, 2002 || Socorro || LINEAR || FLO || align=right data-sort-value="0.99" | 990 m || 
|-id=068 bgcolor=#fefefe
| 166068 ||  || — || February 7, 2002 || Socorro || LINEAR || MAS || align=right | 1.4 km || 
|-id=069 bgcolor=#fefefe
| 166069 ||  || — || February 7, 2002 || Socorro || LINEAR || NYS || align=right | 1.0 km || 
|-id=070 bgcolor=#fefefe
| 166070 ||  || — || February 7, 2002 || Socorro || LINEAR || — || align=right | 1.3 km || 
|-id=071 bgcolor=#fefefe
| 166071 ||  || — || February 7, 2002 || Socorro || LINEAR || V || align=right | 1.2 km || 
|-id=072 bgcolor=#fefefe
| 166072 ||  || — || February 7, 2002 || Socorro || LINEAR || — || align=right | 1.2 km || 
|-id=073 bgcolor=#fefefe
| 166073 ||  || — || February 7, 2002 || Socorro || LINEAR || — || align=right | 2.5 km || 
|-id=074 bgcolor=#fefefe
| 166074 ||  || — || February 7, 2002 || Socorro || LINEAR || — || align=right | 1.8 km || 
|-id=075 bgcolor=#fefefe
| 166075 ||  || — || February 7, 2002 || Socorro || LINEAR || — || align=right | 1.1 km || 
|-id=076 bgcolor=#fefefe
| 166076 ||  || — || February 7, 2002 || Socorro || LINEAR || — || align=right | 4.0 km || 
|-id=077 bgcolor=#fefefe
| 166077 ||  || — || February 7, 2002 || Socorro || LINEAR || FLO || align=right | 1.4 km || 
|-id=078 bgcolor=#fefefe
| 166078 ||  || — || February 7, 2002 || Socorro || LINEAR || — || align=right | 1.8 km || 
|-id=079 bgcolor=#fefefe
| 166079 ||  || — || February 7, 2002 || Socorro || LINEAR || — || align=right | 1.9 km || 
|-id=080 bgcolor=#fefefe
| 166080 ||  || — || February 7, 2002 || Socorro || LINEAR || NYS || align=right | 1.1 km || 
|-id=081 bgcolor=#fefefe
| 166081 ||  || — || February 7, 2002 || Socorro || LINEAR || — || align=right | 1.2 km || 
|-id=082 bgcolor=#fefefe
| 166082 ||  || — || February 7, 2002 || Socorro || LINEAR || — || align=right | 2.7 km || 
|-id=083 bgcolor=#fefefe
| 166083 ||  || — || February 7, 2002 || Socorro || LINEAR || MAS || align=right | 1.4 km || 
|-id=084 bgcolor=#E9E9E9
| 166084 ||  || — || February 8, 2002 || Oaxaca || J. M. Roe || — || align=right | 1.4 km || 
|-id=085 bgcolor=#fefefe
| 166085 ||  || — || February 12, 2002 || Desert Eagle || W. K. Y. Yeung || ERI || align=right | 2.5 km || 
|-id=086 bgcolor=#fefefe
| 166086 ||  || — || February 12, 2002 || Desert Eagle || W. K. Y. Yeung || NYS || align=right | 1.2 km || 
|-id=087 bgcolor=#fefefe
| 166087 ||  || — || February 7, 2002 || Socorro || LINEAR || NYS || align=right | 1.1 km || 
|-id=088 bgcolor=#fefefe
| 166088 ||  || — || February 7, 2002 || Socorro || LINEAR || — || align=right | 1.6 km || 
|-id=089 bgcolor=#fefefe
| 166089 ||  || — || February 7, 2002 || Socorro || LINEAR || FLO || align=right | 1.0 km || 
|-id=090 bgcolor=#fefefe
| 166090 ||  || — || February 7, 2002 || Socorro || LINEAR || MAS || align=right | 1.4 km || 
|-id=091 bgcolor=#fefefe
| 166091 ||  || — || February 7, 2002 || Socorro || LINEAR || NYS || align=right | 1.1 km || 
|-id=092 bgcolor=#fefefe
| 166092 ||  || — || February 8, 2002 || Socorro || LINEAR || — || align=right | 1.1 km || 
|-id=093 bgcolor=#fefefe
| 166093 ||  || — || February 8, 2002 || Socorro || LINEAR || — || align=right data-sort-value="0.89" | 890 m || 
|-id=094 bgcolor=#fefefe
| 166094 ||  || — || February 8, 2002 || Socorro || LINEAR || — || align=right | 1.3 km || 
|-id=095 bgcolor=#fefefe
| 166095 ||  || — || February 9, 2002 || Socorro || LINEAR || — || align=right | 1.4 km || 
|-id=096 bgcolor=#fefefe
| 166096 ||  || — || February 9, 2002 || Socorro || LINEAR || NYS || align=right | 1.1 km || 
|-id=097 bgcolor=#fefefe
| 166097 ||  || — || February 10, 2002 || Socorro || LINEAR || NYS || align=right | 1.1 km || 
|-id=098 bgcolor=#fefefe
| 166098 ||  || — || February 8, 2002 || Kitt Peak || Spacewatch || FLO || align=right data-sort-value="0.92" | 920 m || 
|-id=099 bgcolor=#fefefe
| 166099 ||  || — || February 6, 2002 || Socorro || LINEAR || — || align=right | 1.3 km || 
|-id=100 bgcolor=#fefefe
| 166100 ||  || — || February 7, 2002 || Socorro || LINEAR || — || align=right | 1.1 km || 
|}

166101–166200 

|-bgcolor=#fefefe
| 166101 ||  || — || February 8, 2002 || Socorro || LINEAR || V || align=right | 1.1 km || 
|-id=102 bgcolor=#fefefe
| 166102 ||  || — || February 8, 2002 || Socorro || LINEAR || — || align=right | 1.4 km || 
|-id=103 bgcolor=#fefefe
| 166103 ||  || — || February 8, 2002 || Socorro || LINEAR || — || align=right | 1.6 km || 
|-id=104 bgcolor=#fefefe
| 166104 ||  || — || February 8, 2002 || Socorro || LINEAR || V || align=right | 1.3 km || 
|-id=105 bgcolor=#fefefe
| 166105 ||  || — || February 8, 2002 || Socorro || LINEAR || — || align=right | 1.5 km || 
|-id=106 bgcolor=#fefefe
| 166106 ||  || — || February 8, 2002 || Socorro || LINEAR || FLO || align=right | 1.3 km || 
|-id=107 bgcolor=#fefefe
| 166107 ||  || — || February 8, 2002 || Socorro || LINEAR || — || align=right | 1.1 km || 
|-id=108 bgcolor=#fefefe
| 166108 ||  || — || February 8, 2002 || Socorro || LINEAR || — || align=right | 1.0 km || 
|-id=109 bgcolor=#fefefe
| 166109 ||  || — || February 10, 2002 || Socorro || LINEAR || FLO || align=right | 1.1 km || 
|-id=110 bgcolor=#fefefe
| 166110 ||  || — || February 10, 2002 || Socorro || LINEAR || — || align=right | 1.3 km || 
|-id=111 bgcolor=#fefefe
| 166111 ||  || — || February 10, 2002 || Socorro || LINEAR || — || align=right | 1.1 km || 
|-id=112 bgcolor=#fefefe
| 166112 ||  || — || February 10, 2002 || Socorro || LINEAR || — || align=right | 1.0 km || 
|-id=113 bgcolor=#fefefe
| 166113 ||  || — || February 10, 2002 || Socorro || LINEAR || — || align=right | 1.4 km || 
|-id=114 bgcolor=#fefefe
| 166114 ||  || — || February 10, 2002 || Socorro || LINEAR || — || align=right | 1.5 km || 
|-id=115 bgcolor=#C2FFFF
| 166115 ||  || — || February 10, 2002 || Socorro || LINEAR || L4 || align=right | 9.2 km || 
|-id=116 bgcolor=#fefefe
| 166116 ||  || — || February 10, 2002 || Socorro || LINEAR || MAS || align=right | 1.0 km || 
|-id=117 bgcolor=#fefefe
| 166117 ||  || — || February 10, 2002 || Socorro || LINEAR || FLO || align=right | 1.2 km || 
|-id=118 bgcolor=#fefefe
| 166118 ||  || — || February 10, 2002 || Socorro || LINEAR || — || align=right | 1.2 km || 
|-id=119 bgcolor=#E9E9E9
| 166119 ||  || — || February 10, 2002 || Socorro || LINEAR || — || align=right | 2.5 km || 
|-id=120 bgcolor=#fefefe
| 166120 ||  || — || February 10, 2002 || Socorro || LINEAR || MAS || align=right | 1.2 km || 
|-id=121 bgcolor=#fefefe
| 166121 ||  || — || February 10, 2002 || Socorro || LINEAR || V || align=right | 1.1 km || 
|-id=122 bgcolor=#fefefe
| 166122 ||  || — || February 10, 2002 || Socorro || LINEAR || — || align=right | 1.3 km || 
|-id=123 bgcolor=#C2FFFF
| 166123 ||  || — || February 11, 2002 || Socorro || LINEAR || L4 || align=right | 14 km || 
|-id=124 bgcolor=#fefefe
| 166124 ||  || — || February 6, 2002 || Palomar || NEAT || FLO || align=right | 1.6 km || 
|-id=125 bgcolor=#fefefe
| 166125 ||  || — || February 6, 2002 || Palomar || NEAT || V || align=right | 1.2 km || 
|-id=126 bgcolor=#fefefe
| 166126 ||  || — || February 6, 2002 || Palomar || NEAT || V || align=right | 1.0 km || 
|-id=127 bgcolor=#fefefe
| 166127 ||  || — || February 7, 2002 || Kitt Peak || Spacewatch || V || align=right | 1.2 km || 
|-id=128 bgcolor=#fefefe
| 166128 ||  || — || February 8, 2002 || Socorro || LINEAR || ERI || align=right | 4.0 km || 
|-id=129 bgcolor=#fefefe
| 166129 ||  || — || February 8, 2002 || Socorro || LINEAR || — || align=right | 2.5 km || 
|-id=130 bgcolor=#fefefe
| 166130 ||  || — || February 11, 2002 || Socorro || LINEAR || — || align=right | 1.4 km || 
|-id=131 bgcolor=#fefefe
| 166131 ||  || — || February 3, 2002 || Palomar || NEAT || FLO || align=right | 1.2 km || 
|-id=132 bgcolor=#fefefe
| 166132 ||  || — || February 3, 2002 || Haleakala || NEAT || — || align=right | 1.4 km || 
|-id=133 bgcolor=#fefefe
| 166133 ||  || — || February 7, 2002 || Palomar || NEAT || MAS || align=right | 1.2 km || 
|-id=134 bgcolor=#fefefe
| 166134 ||  || — || February 7, 2002 || Haleakala || NEAT || — || align=right | 1.7 km || 
|-id=135 bgcolor=#fefefe
| 166135 ||  || — || February 10, 2002 || Socorro || LINEAR || — || align=right | 1.2 km || 
|-id=136 bgcolor=#C2FFFF
| 166136 ||  || — || February 10, 2002 || Socorro || LINEAR || L4 || align=right | 13 km || 
|-id=137 bgcolor=#fefefe
| 166137 ||  || — || February 11, 2002 || Socorro || LINEAR || NYS || align=right | 1.3 km || 
|-id=138 bgcolor=#fefefe
| 166138 ||  || — || February 15, 2002 || Socorro || LINEAR || V || align=right data-sort-value="0.98" | 980 m || 
|-id=139 bgcolor=#E9E9E9
| 166139 || 2002 DZ || — || February 16, 2002 || Bohyunsan || Y.-B. Jeon, B.-C. Lee || MIT || align=right | 3.4 km || 
|-id=140 bgcolor=#fefefe
| 166140 ||  || — || February 20, 2002 || Socorro || LINEAR || MAS || align=right | 1.4 km || 
|-id=141 bgcolor=#fefefe
| 166141 ||  || — || February 16, 2002 || Palomar || NEAT || — || align=right | 1.0 km || 
|-id=142 bgcolor=#E9E9E9
| 166142 || 2002 EZ || — || March 5, 2002 || Socorro || LINEAR || — || align=right | 2.9 km || 
|-id=143 bgcolor=#E9E9E9
| 166143 ||  || — || March 9, 2002 || Bohyunsan || Bohyunsan Obs. || — || align=right | 1.4 km || 
|-id=144 bgcolor=#fefefe
| 166144 ||  || — || March 7, 2002 || Cima Ekar || ADAS || NYS || align=right data-sort-value="0.91" | 910 m || 
|-id=145 bgcolor=#fefefe
| 166145 ||  || — || March 10, 2002 || Cima Ekar || ADAS || — || align=right | 1.0 km || 
|-id=146 bgcolor=#fefefe
| 166146 ||  || — || March 14, 2002 || Desert Eagle || W. K. Y. Yeung || — || align=right | 1.6 km || 
|-id=147 bgcolor=#fefefe
| 166147 ||  || — || March 5, 2002 || Palomar || NEAT || — || align=right | 1.6 km || 
|-id=148 bgcolor=#C2FFFF
| 166148 ||  || — || March 5, 2002 || Kitt Peak || Spacewatch || L4 || align=right | 17 km || 
|-id=149 bgcolor=#fefefe
| 166149 ||  || — || March 5, 2002 || Palomar || NEAT || — || align=right | 1.2 km || 
|-id=150 bgcolor=#fefefe
| 166150 ||  || — || March 6, 2002 || Palomar || NEAT || FLO || align=right | 1.2 km || 
|-id=151 bgcolor=#fefefe
| 166151 ||  || — || March 9, 2002 || Socorro || LINEAR || — || align=right | 1.6 km || 
|-id=152 bgcolor=#fefefe
| 166152 ||  || — || March 5, 2002 || Kitt Peak || Spacewatch || — || align=right | 1.4 km || 
|-id=153 bgcolor=#fefefe
| 166153 ||  || — || March 5, 2002 || Kitt Peak || Spacewatch || NYS || align=right data-sort-value="0.95" | 950 m || 
|-id=154 bgcolor=#fefefe
| 166154 ||  || — || March 9, 2002 || Socorro || LINEAR || V || align=right | 1.1 km || 
|-id=155 bgcolor=#fefefe
| 166155 ||  || — || March 9, 2002 || Socorro || LINEAR || — || align=right | 1.4 km || 
|-id=156 bgcolor=#fefefe
| 166156 ||  || — || March 9, 2002 || Socorro || LINEAR || NYS || align=right data-sort-value="0.90" | 900 m || 
|-id=157 bgcolor=#fefefe
| 166157 ||  || — || March 9, 2002 || Socorro || LINEAR || — || align=right | 1.4 km || 
|-id=158 bgcolor=#fefefe
| 166158 ||  || — || March 9, 2002 || Socorro || LINEAR || — || align=right | 1.2 km || 
|-id=159 bgcolor=#fefefe
| 166159 ||  || — || March 11, 2002 || Palomar || NEAT || — || align=right | 1.3 km || 
|-id=160 bgcolor=#fefefe
| 166160 ||  || — || March 11, 2002 || Palomar || NEAT || V || align=right | 1.1 km || 
|-id=161 bgcolor=#fefefe
| 166161 ||  || — || March 11, 2002 || Haleakala || NEAT || NYS || align=right | 2.0 km || 
|-id=162 bgcolor=#fefefe
| 166162 ||  || — || March 9, 2002 || Socorro || LINEAR || — || align=right | 1.0 km || 
|-id=163 bgcolor=#fefefe
| 166163 ||  || — || March 9, 2002 || Socorro || LINEAR || — || align=right | 1.3 km || 
|-id=164 bgcolor=#fefefe
| 166164 ||  || — || March 9, 2002 || Socorro || LINEAR || MAS || align=right | 1.4 km || 
|-id=165 bgcolor=#fefefe
| 166165 ||  || — || March 12, 2002 || Socorro || LINEAR || — || align=right | 2.9 km || 
|-id=166 bgcolor=#fefefe
| 166166 ||  || — || March 12, 2002 || Socorro || LINEAR || NYS || align=right | 1.3 km || 
|-id=167 bgcolor=#fefefe
| 166167 ||  || — || March 10, 2002 || Haleakala || NEAT || — || align=right | 1.2 km || 
|-id=168 bgcolor=#fefefe
| 166168 ||  || — || March 12, 2002 || Palomar || NEAT || FLO || align=right data-sort-value="0.96" | 960 m || 
|-id=169 bgcolor=#fefefe
| 166169 ||  || — || March 12, 2002 || Palomar || NEAT || NYS || align=right data-sort-value="0.81" | 810 m || 
|-id=170 bgcolor=#fefefe
| 166170 ||  || — || March 9, 2002 || Socorro || LINEAR || — || align=right | 1.6 km || 
|-id=171 bgcolor=#fefefe
| 166171 ||  || — || March 13, 2002 || Socorro || LINEAR || — || align=right | 1.7 km || 
|-id=172 bgcolor=#fefefe
| 166172 ||  || — || March 12, 2002 || Socorro || LINEAR || MAS || align=right | 1.2 km || 
|-id=173 bgcolor=#fefefe
| 166173 ||  || — || March 13, 2002 || Socorro || LINEAR || — || align=right | 1.4 km || 
|-id=174 bgcolor=#fefefe
| 166174 ||  || — || March 13, 2002 || Socorro || LINEAR || — || align=right | 2.4 km || 
|-id=175 bgcolor=#fefefe
| 166175 ||  || — || March 13, 2002 || Socorro || LINEAR || V || align=right | 1.2 km || 
|-id=176 bgcolor=#fefefe
| 166176 ||  || — || March 13, 2002 || Socorro || LINEAR || — || align=right | 1.4 km || 
|-id=177 bgcolor=#E9E9E9
| 166177 ||  || — || March 13, 2002 || Socorro || LINEAR || — || align=right | 1.3 km || 
|-id=178 bgcolor=#fefefe
| 166178 ||  || — || March 13, 2002 || Socorro || LINEAR || V || align=right | 1.2 km || 
|-id=179 bgcolor=#fefefe
| 166179 ||  || — || March 13, 2002 || Socorro || LINEAR || NYS || align=right data-sort-value="0.92" | 920 m || 
|-id=180 bgcolor=#fefefe
| 166180 ||  || — || March 13, 2002 || Socorro || LINEAR || — || align=right | 1.3 km || 
|-id=181 bgcolor=#fefefe
| 166181 ||  || — || March 13, 2002 || Socorro || LINEAR || V || align=right | 1.0 km || 
|-id=182 bgcolor=#fefefe
| 166182 ||  || — || March 13, 2002 || Socorro || LINEAR || NYS || align=right | 3.3 km || 
|-id=183 bgcolor=#fefefe
| 166183 ||  || — || March 13, 2002 || Socorro || LINEAR || — || align=right | 1.7 km || 
|-id=184 bgcolor=#fefefe
| 166184 ||  || — || March 13, 2002 || Palomar || NEAT || NYS || align=right data-sort-value="0.81" | 810 m || 
|-id=185 bgcolor=#fefefe
| 166185 ||  || — || March 13, 2002 || Palomar || NEAT || — || align=right | 1.7 km || 
|-id=186 bgcolor=#fefefe
| 166186 ||  || — || March 9, 2002 || Socorro || LINEAR || MAS || align=right | 1.1 km || 
|-id=187 bgcolor=#fefefe
| 166187 ||  || — || March 9, 2002 || Socorro || LINEAR || — || align=right | 2.2 km || 
|-id=188 bgcolor=#fefefe
| 166188 ||  || — || March 9, 2002 || Socorro || LINEAR || — || align=right | 1.7 km || 
|-id=189 bgcolor=#fefefe
| 166189 ||  || — || March 12, 2002 || Socorro || LINEAR || — || align=right | 1.4 km || 
|-id=190 bgcolor=#fefefe
| 166190 ||  || — || March 12, 2002 || Socorro || LINEAR || — || align=right | 1.6 km || 
|-id=191 bgcolor=#fefefe
| 166191 ||  || — || March 12, 2002 || Socorro || LINEAR || — || align=right | 3.2 km || 
|-id=192 bgcolor=#fefefe
| 166192 ||  || — || March 13, 2002 || Socorro || LINEAR || NYS || align=right | 3.2 km || 
|-id=193 bgcolor=#fefefe
| 166193 ||  || — || March 14, 2002 || Socorro || LINEAR || — || align=right | 1.2 km || 
|-id=194 bgcolor=#fefefe
| 166194 ||  || — || March 14, 2002 || Socorro || LINEAR || — || align=right | 1.3 km || 
|-id=195 bgcolor=#fefefe
| 166195 ||  || — || March 14, 2002 || Socorro || LINEAR || NYS || align=right | 2.9 km || 
|-id=196 bgcolor=#fefefe
| 166196 ||  || — || March 11, 2002 || Kitt Peak || Spacewatch || NYS || align=right data-sort-value="0.92" | 920 m || 
|-id=197 bgcolor=#fefefe
| 166197 ||  || — || March 9, 2002 || Palomar || NEAT || MAS || align=right | 1.0 km || 
|-id=198 bgcolor=#fefefe
| 166198 ||  || — || March 9, 2002 || Kitt Peak || Spacewatch || NYS || align=right | 1.0 km || 
|-id=199 bgcolor=#fefefe
| 166199 ||  || — || March 9, 2002 || Kitt Peak || Spacewatch || MAS || align=right data-sort-value="0.96" | 960 m || 
|-id=200 bgcolor=#fefefe
| 166200 ||  || — || March 10, 2002 || Palomar || NEAT || — || align=right | 1.2 km || 
|}

166201–166300 

|-bgcolor=#fefefe
| 166201 ||  || — || March 11, 2002 || Kitt Peak || Spacewatch || — || align=right | 1.6 km || 
|-id=202 bgcolor=#fefefe
| 166202 ||  || — || March 12, 2002 || Palomar || NEAT || NYS || align=right data-sort-value="0.93" | 930 m || 
|-id=203 bgcolor=#fefefe
| 166203 ||  || — || March 12, 2002 || Socorro || LINEAR || MAS || align=right | 1.4 km || 
|-id=204 bgcolor=#fefefe
| 166204 ||  || — || March 12, 2002 || Palomar || NEAT || V || align=right | 1.1 km || 
|-id=205 bgcolor=#fefefe
| 166205 ||  || — || March 12, 2002 || Kitt Peak || Spacewatch || — || align=right data-sort-value="0.87" | 870 m || 
|-id=206 bgcolor=#fefefe
| 166206 ||  || — || March 12, 2002 || Socorro || LINEAR || ERI || align=right | 2.0 km || 
|-id=207 bgcolor=#fefefe
| 166207 ||  || — || March 12, 2002 || Socorro || LINEAR || V || align=right | 1.1 km || 
|-id=208 bgcolor=#fefefe
| 166208 ||  || — || March 12, 2002 || Palomar || NEAT || — || align=right | 1.1 km || 
|-id=209 bgcolor=#fefefe
| 166209 ||  || — || March 13, 2002 || Socorro || LINEAR || V || align=right | 1.0 km || 
|-id=210 bgcolor=#fefefe
| 166210 ||  || — || March 13, 2002 || Palomar || NEAT || — || align=right | 1.4 km || 
|-id=211 bgcolor=#C2FFFF
| 166211 ||  || — || March 14, 2002 || Anderson Mesa || LONEOS || L4ERY || align=right | 14 km || 
|-id=212 bgcolor=#fefefe
| 166212 ||  || — || March 12, 2002 || Palomar || NEAT || — || align=right | 1.3 km || 
|-id=213 bgcolor=#fefefe
| 166213 ||  || — || March 12, 2002 || Palomar || NEAT || NYS || align=right | 1.0 km || 
|-id=214 bgcolor=#fefefe
| 166214 ||  || — || March 13, 2002 || Kitt Peak || Spacewatch || — || align=right | 1.2 km || 
|-id=215 bgcolor=#fefefe
| 166215 ||  || — || March 14, 2002 || Palomar || NEAT || V || align=right | 1.3 km || 
|-id=216 bgcolor=#fefefe
| 166216 ||  || — || March 14, 2002 || Anderson Mesa || LONEOS || — || align=right | 1.8 km || 
|-id=217 bgcolor=#fefefe
| 166217 ||  || — || March 15, 2002 || Palomar || NEAT || MAS || align=right | 1.2 km || 
|-id=218 bgcolor=#fefefe
| 166218 ||  || — || March 15, 2002 || Palomar || NEAT || — || align=right | 1.5 km || 
|-id=219 bgcolor=#fefefe
| 166219 ||  || — || March 15, 2002 || Palomar || NEAT || — || align=right | 1.8 km || 
|-id=220 bgcolor=#fefefe
| 166220 ||  || — || March 15, 2002 || Palomar || NEAT || V || align=right | 1.2 km || 
|-id=221 bgcolor=#fefefe
| 166221 ||  || — || March 13, 2002 || Socorro || LINEAR || V || align=right | 1.0 km || 
|-id=222 bgcolor=#fefefe
| 166222 ||  || — || March 20, 2002 || Desert Eagle || W. K. Y. Yeung || V || align=right | 1.2 km || 
|-id=223 bgcolor=#fefefe
| 166223 ||  || — || March 23, 2002 || Nogales || Tenagra II Obs. || — || align=right | 1.7 km || 
|-id=224 bgcolor=#fefefe
| 166224 ||  || — || March 16, 2002 || Socorro || LINEAR || ERI || align=right | 2.4 km || 
|-id=225 bgcolor=#fefefe
| 166225 ||  || — || March 16, 2002 || Socorro || LINEAR || — || align=right | 2.1 km || 
|-id=226 bgcolor=#fefefe
| 166226 ||  || — || March 16, 2002 || Haleakala || NEAT || V || align=right | 1.3 km || 
|-id=227 bgcolor=#fefefe
| 166227 ||  || — || March 16, 2002 || Socorro || LINEAR || V || align=right | 1.2 km || 
|-id=228 bgcolor=#fefefe
| 166228 ||  || — || March 16, 2002 || Socorro || LINEAR || FLO || align=right | 1.3 km || 
|-id=229 bgcolor=#fefefe
| 166229 Palanga ||  ||  || March 17, 2002 || Moletai || K. Černis || — || align=right | 1.7 km || 
|-id=230 bgcolor=#C2FFFF
| 166230 ||  || — || March 17, 2002 || Kitt Peak || Spacewatch || L4 || align=right | 16 km || 
|-id=231 bgcolor=#fefefe
| 166231 ||  || — || March 18, 2002 || Kitt Peak || Spacewatch || NYS || align=right | 1.1 km || 
|-id=232 bgcolor=#fefefe
| 166232 ||  || — || March 19, 2002 || Anderson Mesa || LONEOS || — || align=right | 1.3 km || 
|-id=233 bgcolor=#fefefe
| 166233 ||  || — || March 20, 2002 || Palomar || NEAT || — || align=right | 1.5 km || 
|-id=234 bgcolor=#fefefe
| 166234 ||  || — || March 20, 2002 || Anderson Mesa || LONEOS || MAS || align=right | 1.3 km || 
|-id=235 bgcolor=#fefefe
| 166235 ||  || — || March 20, 2002 || Socorro || LINEAR || — || align=right | 1.8 km || 
|-id=236 bgcolor=#fefefe
| 166236 ||  || — || March 20, 2002 || Socorro || LINEAR || KLI || align=right | 4.0 km || 
|-id=237 bgcolor=#fefefe
| 166237 ||  || — || March 20, 2002 || Socorro || LINEAR || V || align=right | 1.3 km || 
|-id=238 bgcolor=#fefefe
| 166238 ||  || — || March 20, 2002 || Socorro || LINEAR || — || align=right | 1.3 km || 
|-id=239 bgcolor=#E9E9E9
| 166239 ||  || — || March 31, 2002 || Palomar || NEAT || — || align=right | 1.8 km || 
|-id=240 bgcolor=#fefefe
| 166240 ||  || — || March 16, 2002 || Socorro || LINEAR || MAS || align=right | 1.3 km || 
|-id=241 bgcolor=#E9E9E9
| 166241 ||  || — || April 15, 2002 || Desert Eagle || W. K. Y. Yeung || — || align=right | 1.6 km || 
|-id=242 bgcolor=#fefefe
| 166242 ||  || — || April 15, 2002 || Palomar || NEAT || — || align=right | 3.8 km || 
|-id=243 bgcolor=#fefefe
| 166243 ||  || — || April 14, 2002 || Socorro || LINEAR || NYS || align=right | 1.4 km || 
|-id=244 bgcolor=#fefefe
| 166244 ||  || — || April 14, 2002 || Socorro || LINEAR || NYS || align=right | 1.2 km || 
|-id=245 bgcolor=#fefefe
| 166245 ||  || — || April 15, 2002 || Socorro || LINEAR || NYS || align=right | 1.1 km || 
|-id=246 bgcolor=#fefefe
| 166246 ||  || — || April 15, 2002 || Socorro || LINEAR || NYS || align=right | 3.8 km || 
|-id=247 bgcolor=#fefefe
| 166247 ||  || — || April 14, 2002 || Socorro || LINEAR || NYS || align=right | 1.2 km || 
|-id=248 bgcolor=#fefefe
| 166248 ||  || — || April 14, 2002 || Socorro || LINEAR || MAS || align=right | 1.5 km || 
|-id=249 bgcolor=#fefefe
| 166249 ||  || — || April 14, 2002 || Socorro || LINEAR || NYS || align=right | 1.5 km || 
|-id=250 bgcolor=#fefefe
| 166250 ||  || — || April 15, 2002 || Palomar || NEAT || — || align=right | 1.6 km || 
|-id=251 bgcolor=#fefefe
| 166251 ||  || — || April 15, 2002 || Palomar || NEAT || NYS || align=right | 1.1 km || 
|-id=252 bgcolor=#E9E9E9
| 166252 ||  || — || April 13, 2002 || Kitt Peak || Spacewatch || — || align=right | 1.4 km || 
|-id=253 bgcolor=#fefefe
| 166253 ||  || — || April 15, 2002 || Kitt Peak || Spacewatch || — || align=right | 1.5 km || 
|-id=254 bgcolor=#fefefe
| 166254 ||  || — || April 1, 2002 || Palomar || NEAT || — || align=right | 1.4 km || 
|-id=255 bgcolor=#fefefe
| 166255 ||  || — || April 4, 2002 || Palomar || NEAT || MAS || align=right | 1.1 km || 
|-id=256 bgcolor=#E9E9E9
| 166256 ||  || — || April 4, 2002 || Palomar || NEAT || GER || align=right | 2.4 km || 
|-id=257 bgcolor=#E9E9E9
| 166257 ||  || — || April 5, 2002 || Anderson Mesa || LONEOS || — || align=right | 1.2 km || 
|-id=258 bgcolor=#fefefe
| 166258 ||  || — || April 8, 2002 || Palomar || NEAT || — || align=right | 1.4 km || 
|-id=259 bgcolor=#fefefe
| 166259 ||  || — || April 8, 2002 || Palomar || NEAT || — || align=right | 1.4 km || 
|-id=260 bgcolor=#fefefe
| 166260 ||  || — || April 8, 2002 || Kitt Peak || Spacewatch || V || align=right | 1.2 km || 
|-id=261 bgcolor=#fefefe
| 166261 ||  || — || April 8, 2002 || Kitt Peak || Spacewatch || NYS || align=right | 1.1 km || 
|-id=262 bgcolor=#E9E9E9
| 166262 ||  || — || April 8, 2002 || Socorro || LINEAR || — || align=right | 3.5 km || 
|-id=263 bgcolor=#E9E9E9
| 166263 ||  || — || April 8, 2002 || Palomar || NEAT || — || align=right | 3.0 km || 
|-id=264 bgcolor=#fefefe
| 166264 ||  || — || April 9, 2002 || Socorro || LINEAR || — || align=right | 1.9 km || 
|-id=265 bgcolor=#d6d6d6
| 166265 ||  || — || April 10, 2002 || Socorro || LINEAR || — || align=right | 4.7 km || 
|-id=266 bgcolor=#fefefe
| 166266 ||  || — || April 10, 2002 || Socorro || LINEAR || — || align=right | 1.8 km || 
|-id=267 bgcolor=#fefefe
| 166267 ||  || — || April 10, 2002 || Socorro || LINEAR || — || align=right | 1.5 km || 
|-id=268 bgcolor=#fefefe
| 166268 ||  || — || April 8, 2002 || Palomar || NEAT || EUT || align=right | 1.0 km || 
|-id=269 bgcolor=#fefefe
| 166269 ||  || — || April 8, 2002 || Kitt Peak || Spacewatch || — || align=right | 1.7 km || 
|-id=270 bgcolor=#fefefe
| 166270 ||  || — || April 8, 2002 || Kitt Peak || Spacewatch || — || align=right | 1.3 km || 
|-id=271 bgcolor=#fefefe
| 166271 ||  || — || April 8, 2002 || Palomar || NEAT || — || align=right | 1.3 km || 
|-id=272 bgcolor=#E9E9E9
| 166272 ||  || — || April 9, 2002 || Socorro || LINEAR || ADE || align=right | 2.8 km || 
|-id=273 bgcolor=#fefefe
| 166273 ||  || — || April 9, 2002 || Socorro || LINEAR || — || align=right | 1.4 km || 
|-id=274 bgcolor=#fefefe
| 166274 ||  || — || April 9, 2002 || Socorro || LINEAR || — || align=right | 1.6 km || 
|-id=275 bgcolor=#fefefe
| 166275 ||  || — || April 9, 2002 || Socorro || LINEAR || — || align=right | 1.7 km || 
|-id=276 bgcolor=#fefefe
| 166276 ||  || — || April 9, 2002 || Socorro || LINEAR || — || align=right | 1.4 km || 
|-id=277 bgcolor=#fefefe
| 166277 ||  || — || April 9, 2002 || Socorro || LINEAR || NYS || align=right | 1.1 km || 
|-id=278 bgcolor=#fefefe
| 166278 ||  || — || April 9, 2002 || Socorro || LINEAR || V || align=right | 1.7 km || 
|-id=279 bgcolor=#fefefe
| 166279 ||  || — || April 10, 2002 || Socorro || LINEAR || — || align=right | 1.5 km || 
|-id=280 bgcolor=#fefefe
| 166280 ||  || — || April 10, 2002 || Socorro || LINEAR || V || align=right | 1.2 km || 
|-id=281 bgcolor=#fefefe
| 166281 ||  || — || April 12, 2002 || Palomar || NEAT || FLO || align=right | 1.1 km || 
|-id=282 bgcolor=#fefefe
| 166282 ||  || — || April 11, 2002 || Socorro || LINEAR || FLO || align=right data-sort-value="0.93" | 930 m || 
|-id=283 bgcolor=#fefefe
| 166283 ||  || — || April 12, 2002 || Socorro || LINEAR || — || align=right | 1.3 km || 
|-id=284 bgcolor=#fefefe
| 166284 ||  || — || April 12, 2002 || Socorro || LINEAR || V || align=right | 1.0 km || 
|-id=285 bgcolor=#C2FFFF
| 166285 ||  || — || April 12, 2002 || Socorro || LINEAR || L4 || align=right | 13 km || 
|-id=286 bgcolor=#E9E9E9
| 166286 ||  || — || April 12, 2002 || Socorro || LINEAR || — || align=right | 1.3 km || 
|-id=287 bgcolor=#fefefe
| 166287 ||  || — || April 12, 2002 || Haleakala || NEAT || V || align=right | 1.1 km || 
|-id=288 bgcolor=#fefefe
| 166288 ||  || — || April 15, 2002 || Palomar || NEAT || — || align=right | 1.4 km || 
|-id=289 bgcolor=#fefefe
| 166289 ||  || — || April 14, 2002 || Palomar || NEAT || — || align=right | 1.3 km || 
|-id=290 bgcolor=#E9E9E9
| 166290 ||  || — || April 16, 2002 || Socorro || LINEAR || — || align=right | 2.7 km || 
|-id=291 bgcolor=#fefefe
| 166291 ||  || — || April 17, 2002 || Socorro || LINEAR || — || align=right | 1.7 km || 
|-id=292 bgcolor=#E9E9E9
| 166292 ||  || — || April 17, 2002 || Socorro || LINEAR || BRG || align=right | 2.4 km || 
|-id=293 bgcolor=#fefefe
| 166293 ||  || — || April 18, 2002 || Kitt Peak || Spacewatch || NYS || align=right data-sort-value="0.98" | 980 m || 
|-id=294 bgcolor=#fefefe
| 166294 ||  || — || April 18, 2002 || Kitt Peak || Spacewatch || — || align=right | 1.7 km || 
|-id=295 bgcolor=#E9E9E9
| 166295 ||  || — || May 3, 2002 || Kitt Peak || Spacewatch || — || align=right | 2.3 km || 
|-id=296 bgcolor=#E9E9E9
| 166296 ||  || — || May 3, 2002 || Anderson Mesa || LONEOS || — || align=right | 3.4 km || 
|-id=297 bgcolor=#fefefe
| 166297 ||  || — || May 5, 2002 || Desert Eagle || W. K. Y. Yeung || MAS || align=right | 1.4 km || 
|-id=298 bgcolor=#E9E9E9
| 166298 ||  || — || May 6, 2002 || Kitt Peak || Spacewatch || MIS || align=right | 3.1 km || 
|-id=299 bgcolor=#E9E9E9
| 166299 ||  || — || May 6, 2002 || Palomar || NEAT || RAF || align=right | 1.1 km || 
|-id=300 bgcolor=#fefefe
| 166300 ||  || — || May 4, 2002 || Desert Eagle || W. K. Y. Yeung || MAS || align=right | 1.2 km || 
|}

166301–166400 

|-bgcolor=#fefefe
| 166301 ||  || — || May 8, 2002 || Desert Eagle || W. K. Y. Yeung || — || align=right | 1.4 km || 
|-id=302 bgcolor=#fefefe
| 166302 ||  || — || May 8, 2002 || Socorro || LINEAR || NYS || align=right | 1.3 km || 
|-id=303 bgcolor=#fefefe
| 166303 ||  || — || May 5, 2002 || Desert Eagle || W. K. Y. Yeung || V || align=right | 1.6 km || 
|-id=304 bgcolor=#E9E9E9
| 166304 ||  || — || May 6, 2002 || Palomar || NEAT || — || align=right | 2.6 km || 
|-id=305 bgcolor=#E9E9E9
| 166305 ||  || — || May 8, 2002 || Socorro || LINEAR || MIT || align=right | 3.2 km || 
|-id=306 bgcolor=#E9E9E9
| 166306 ||  || — || May 8, 2002 || Socorro || LINEAR || — || align=right | 2.1 km || 
|-id=307 bgcolor=#E9E9E9
| 166307 ||  || — || May 8, 2002 || Socorro || LINEAR || — || align=right | 1.5 km || 
|-id=308 bgcolor=#fefefe
| 166308 ||  || — || May 8, 2002 || Socorro || LINEAR || NYS || align=right | 1.6 km || 
|-id=309 bgcolor=#E9E9E9
| 166309 ||  || — || May 9, 2002 || Socorro || LINEAR || — || align=right | 2.6 km || 
|-id=310 bgcolor=#fefefe
| 166310 ||  || — || May 7, 2002 || Anderson Mesa || LONEOS || — || align=right | 1.4 km || 
|-id=311 bgcolor=#E9E9E9
| 166311 ||  || — || May 7, 2002 || Anderson Mesa || LONEOS || — || align=right | 2.7 km || 
|-id=312 bgcolor=#fefefe
| 166312 ||  || — || May 9, 2002 || Socorro || LINEAR || FLO || align=right | 1.5 km || 
|-id=313 bgcolor=#fefefe
| 166313 ||  || — || May 9, 2002 || Socorro || LINEAR || NYS || align=right | 1.1 km || 
|-id=314 bgcolor=#fefefe
| 166314 ||  || — || May 9, 2002 || Socorro || LINEAR || NYS || align=right | 1.1 km || 
|-id=315 bgcolor=#E9E9E9
| 166315 ||  || — || May 9, 2002 || Socorro || LINEAR || — || align=right | 2.1 km || 
|-id=316 bgcolor=#fefefe
| 166316 ||  || — || May 9, 2002 || Socorro || LINEAR || MAS || align=right | 1.5 km || 
|-id=317 bgcolor=#E9E9E9
| 166317 ||  || — || May 9, 2002 || Socorro || LINEAR || — || align=right | 2.3 km || 
|-id=318 bgcolor=#E9E9E9
| 166318 ||  || — || May 9, 2002 || Socorro || LINEAR || — || align=right | 1.9 km || 
|-id=319 bgcolor=#E9E9E9
| 166319 ||  || — || May 8, 2002 || Socorro || LINEAR || — || align=right | 2.0 km || 
|-id=320 bgcolor=#fefefe
| 166320 ||  || — || May 9, 2002 || Socorro || LINEAR || — || align=right | 1.8 km || 
|-id=321 bgcolor=#E9E9E9
| 166321 ||  || — || May 10, 2002 || Socorro || LINEAR || — || align=right | 3.9 km || 
|-id=322 bgcolor=#E9E9E9
| 166322 ||  || — || May 9, 2002 || Socorro || LINEAR || EUN || align=right | 2.0 km || 
|-id=323 bgcolor=#E9E9E9
| 166323 ||  || — || May 11, 2002 || Socorro || LINEAR || — || align=right | 1.4 km || 
|-id=324 bgcolor=#fefefe
| 166324 ||  || — || May 11, 2002 || Socorro || LINEAR || MAS || align=right | 1.1 km || 
|-id=325 bgcolor=#fefefe
| 166325 ||  || — || May 11, 2002 || Socorro || LINEAR || — || align=right | 1.3 km || 
|-id=326 bgcolor=#E9E9E9
| 166326 ||  || — || May 11, 2002 || Socorro || LINEAR || — || align=right | 1.3 km || 
|-id=327 bgcolor=#E9E9E9
| 166327 ||  || — || May 11, 2002 || Socorro || LINEAR || — || align=right | 1.7 km || 
|-id=328 bgcolor=#E9E9E9
| 166328 ||  || — || May 11, 2002 || Socorro || LINEAR || — || align=right | 1.5 km || 
|-id=329 bgcolor=#E9E9E9
| 166329 ||  || — || May 11, 2002 || Socorro || LINEAR || — || align=right | 2.8 km || 
|-id=330 bgcolor=#fefefe
| 166330 ||  || — || May 11, 2002 || Socorro || LINEAR || MAS || align=right | 1.5 km || 
|-id=331 bgcolor=#fefefe
| 166331 ||  || — || May 11, 2002 || Socorro || LINEAR || V || align=right | 1.1 km || 
|-id=332 bgcolor=#fefefe
| 166332 ||  || — || May 11, 2002 || Socorro || LINEAR || NYS || align=right | 1.1 km || 
|-id=333 bgcolor=#fefefe
| 166333 ||  || — || May 11, 2002 || Socorro || LINEAR || NYS || align=right | 1.1 km || 
|-id=334 bgcolor=#E9E9E9
| 166334 ||  || — || May 12, 2002 || Palomar || NEAT || — || align=right | 1.4 km || 
|-id=335 bgcolor=#E9E9E9
| 166335 ||  || — || May 6, 2002 || Socorro || LINEAR || BAR || align=right | 2.1 km || 
|-id=336 bgcolor=#E9E9E9
| 166336 ||  || — || May 5, 2002 || Palomar || NEAT || ADE || align=right | 3.7 km || 
|-id=337 bgcolor=#E9E9E9
| 166337 ||  || — || May 6, 2002 || Palomar || NEAT || — || align=right | 1.6 km || 
|-id=338 bgcolor=#fefefe
| 166338 ||  || — || May 7, 2002 || Palomar || NEAT || NYS || align=right | 1.0 km || 
|-id=339 bgcolor=#fefefe
| 166339 ||  || — || May 7, 2002 || Palomar || NEAT || V || align=right | 1.0 km || 
|-id=340 bgcolor=#E9E9E9
| 166340 ||  || — || May 8, 2002 || Socorro || LINEAR || — || align=right | 1.4 km || 
|-id=341 bgcolor=#fefefe
| 166341 ||  || — || May 8, 2002 || Socorro || LINEAR || — || align=right | 1.8 km || 
|-id=342 bgcolor=#E9E9E9
| 166342 ||  || — || May 9, 2002 || Socorro || LINEAR || — || align=right | 4.0 km || 
|-id=343 bgcolor=#fefefe
| 166343 ||  || — || May 9, 2002 || Palomar || NEAT || — || align=right | 1.5 km || 
|-id=344 bgcolor=#E9E9E9
| 166344 ||  || — || May 10, 2002 || Palomar || NEAT || — || align=right | 3.5 km || 
|-id=345 bgcolor=#E9E9E9
| 166345 ||  || — || May 13, 2002 || Palomar || NEAT || — || align=right | 2.2 km || 
|-id=346 bgcolor=#E9E9E9
| 166346 ||  || — || May 14, 2002 || Palomar || NEAT || — || align=right | 1.9 km || 
|-id=347 bgcolor=#E9E9E9
| 166347 ||  || — || May 17, 2002 || Palomar || NEAT || — || align=right | 2.1 km || 
|-id=348 bgcolor=#E9E9E9
| 166348 ||  || — || May 18, 2002 || Palomar || NEAT || BRU || align=right | 3.2 km || 
|-id=349 bgcolor=#E9E9E9
| 166349 ||  || — || May 19, 2002 || Needville || Needville Obs. || MIS || align=right | 3.5 km || 
|-id=350 bgcolor=#E9E9E9
| 166350 ||  || — || May 16, 2002 || Socorro || LINEAR || — || align=right | 3.0 km || 
|-id=351 bgcolor=#C2FFFF
| 166351 ||  || — || May 28, 2002 || Palomar || NEAT || L4 || align=right | 13 km || 
|-id=352 bgcolor=#E9E9E9
| 166352 ||  || — || May 27, 2002 || Palomar || NEAT || — || align=right | 3.7 km || 
|-id=353 bgcolor=#E9E9E9
| 166353 ||  || — || May 16, 2002 || Socorro || LINEAR || — || align=right | 1.3 km || 
|-id=354 bgcolor=#E9E9E9
| 166354 ||  || — || May 16, 2002 || Socorro || LINEAR || — || align=right | 2.4 km || 
|-id=355 bgcolor=#fefefe
| 166355 ||  || — || May 16, 2002 || Socorro || LINEAR || — || align=right | 1.2 km || 
|-id=356 bgcolor=#E9E9E9
| 166356 ||  || — || May 30, 2002 || Palomar || NEAT || — || align=right | 3.0 km || 
|-id=357 bgcolor=#E9E9E9
| 166357 ||  || — || June 5, 2002 || Socorro || LINEAR || — || align=right | 2.4 km || 
|-id=358 bgcolor=#E9E9E9
| 166358 ||  || — || June 1, 2002 || Palomar || NEAT || MAR || align=right | 2.1 km || 
|-id=359 bgcolor=#E9E9E9
| 166359 ||  || — || June 6, 2002 || Socorro || LINEAR || — || align=right | 1.6 km || 
|-id=360 bgcolor=#E9E9E9
| 166360 ||  || — || June 6, 2002 || Socorro || LINEAR || — || align=right | 3.1 km || 
|-id=361 bgcolor=#E9E9E9
| 166361 ||  || — || June 6, 2002 || Socorro || LINEAR || — || align=right | 2.6 km || 
|-id=362 bgcolor=#E9E9E9
| 166362 ||  || — || June 6, 2002 || Socorro || LINEAR || EUN || align=right | 2.0 km || 
|-id=363 bgcolor=#E9E9E9
| 166363 ||  || — || June 8, 2002 || Socorro || LINEAR || — || align=right | 4.0 km || 
|-id=364 bgcolor=#E9E9E9
| 166364 ||  || — || June 2, 2002 || Palomar || NEAT || — || align=right | 1.5 km || 
|-id=365 bgcolor=#E9E9E9
| 166365 ||  || — || June 2, 2002 || Palomar || NEAT || — || align=right | 2.1 km || 
|-id=366 bgcolor=#E9E9E9
| 166366 ||  || — || June 3, 2002 || Socorro || LINEAR || — || align=right | 3.8 km || 
|-id=367 bgcolor=#E9E9E9
| 166367 ||  || — || June 6, 2002 || Socorro || LINEAR || MIS || align=right | 3.1 km || 
|-id=368 bgcolor=#E9E9E9
| 166368 ||  || — || June 7, 2002 || Socorro || LINEAR || — || align=right | 4.2 km || 
|-id=369 bgcolor=#E9E9E9
| 166369 ||  || — || June 9, 2002 || Socorro || LINEAR || — || align=right | 1.6 km || 
|-id=370 bgcolor=#E9E9E9
| 166370 ||  || — || June 9, 2002 || Socorro || LINEAR || ADE || align=right | 2.6 km || 
|-id=371 bgcolor=#fefefe
| 166371 ||  || — || June 10, 2002 || Reedy Creek || J. Broughton || — || align=right | 1.9 km || 
|-id=372 bgcolor=#E9E9E9
| 166372 ||  || — || June 11, 2002 || Fountain Hills || C. W. Juels, P. R. Holvorcem || — || align=right | 3.6 km || 
|-id=373 bgcolor=#E9E9E9
| 166373 ||  || — || June 3, 2002 || Socorro || LINEAR || — || align=right | 2.6 km || 
|-id=374 bgcolor=#E9E9E9
| 166374 ||  || — || June 9, 2002 || Socorro || LINEAR || — || align=right | 4.9 km || 
|-id=375 bgcolor=#E9E9E9
| 166375 ||  || — || June 10, 2002 || Socorro || LINEAR || — || align=right | 2.6 km || 
|-id=376 bgcolor=#E9E9E9
| 166376 ||  || — || June 10, 2002 || Socorro || LINEAR || EUN || align=right | 1.8 km || 
|-id=377 bgcolor=#E9E9E9
| 166377 ||  || — || June 10, 2002 || Socorro || LINEAR || EUN || align=right | 2.5 km || 
|-id=378 bgcolor=#E9E9E9
| 166378 ||  || — || June 10, 2002 || Socorro || LINEAR || — || align=right | 3.4 km || 
|-id=379 bgcolor=#E9E9E9
| 166379 ||  || — || June 11, 2002 || Socorro || LINEAR || — || align=right | 3.1 km || 
|-id=380 bgcolor=#E9E9E9
| 166380 ||  || — || June 11, 2002 || Socorro || LINEAR || — || align=right | 2.9 km || 
|-id=381 bgcolor=#E9E9E9
| 166381 ||  || — || June 12, 2002 || Socorro || LINEAR || — || align=right | 3.3 km || 
|-id=382 bgcolor=#E9E9E9
| 166382 ||  || — || June 8, 2002 || Socorro || LINEAR || — || align=right | 1.8 km || 
|-id=383 bgcolor=#E9E9E9
| 166383 ||  || — || June 6, 2002 || Socorro || LINEAR || — || align=right | 4.2 km || 
|-id=384 bgcolor=#E9E9E9
| 166384 ||  || — || June 11, 2002 || Palomar || NEAT || BRG || align=right | 2.6 km || 
|-id=385 bgcolor=#E9E9E9
| 166385 ||  || — || June 24, 2002 || Haleakala || NEAT || — || align=right | 6.2 km || 
|-id=386 bgcolor=#E9E9E9
| 166386 ||  || — || July 8, 2002 || Kleť || Kleť Obs. || — || align=right | 1.5 km || 
|-id=387 bgcolor=#E9E9E9
| 166387 ||  || — || July 10, 2002 || Campo Imperatore || CINEOS || WIT || align=right | 1.8 km || 
|-id=388 bgcolor=#E9E9E9
| 166388 ||  || — || July 10, 2002 || Campo Imperatore || CINEOS || HEN || align=right | 1.8 km || 
|-id=389 bgcolor=#E9E9E9
| 166389 ||  || — || July 9, 2002 || Socorro || LINEAR || — || align=right | 2.8 km || 
|-id=390 bgcolor=#E9E9E9
| 166390 ||  || — || July 1, 2002 || Palomar || NEAT || MAR || align=right | 2.6 km || 
|-id=391 bgcolor=#E9E9E9
| 166391 ||  || — || July 3, 2002 || Palomar || NEAT || — || align=right | 4.6 km || 
|-id=392 bgcolor=#E9E9E9
| 166392 ||  || — || July 4, 2002 || Palomar || NEAT || — || align=right | 4.1 km || 
|-id=393 bgcolor=#E9E9E9
| 166393 ||  || — || July 3, 2002 || Palomar || NEAT || — || align=right | 3.2 km || 
|-id=394 bgcolor=#E9E9E9
| 166394 ||  || — || July 5, 2002 || Socorro || LINEAR || — || align=right | 5.6 km || 
|-id=395 bgcolor=#E9E9E9
| 166395 ||  || — || July 9, 2002 || Socorro || LINEAR || — || align=right | 4.1 km || 
|-id=396 bgcolor=#E9E9E9
| 166396 ||  || — || July 9, 2002 || Socorro || LINEAR || MAR || align=right | 2.1 km || 
|-id=397 bgcolor=#E9E9E9
| 166397 ||  || — || July 9, 2002 || Socorro || LINEAR || ADE || align=right | 3.7 km || 
|-id=398 bgcolor=#E9E9E9
| 166398 ||  || — || July 9, 2002 || Socorro || LINEAR || — || align=right | 5.0 km || 
|-id=399 bgcolor=#E9E9E9
| 166399 ||  || — || July 9, 2002 || Socorro || LINEAR || ADE || align=right | 5.0 km || 
|-id=400 bgcolor=#E9E9E9
| 166400 ||  || — || July 9, 2002 || Socorro || LINEAR || — || align=right | 2.2 km || 
|}

166401–166500 

|-bgcolor=#E9E9E9
| 166401 ||  || — || July 9, 2002 || Socorro || LINEAR || — || align=right | 4.0 km || 
|-id=402 bgcolor=#d6d6d6
| 166402 ||  || — || July 4, 2002 || Kitt Peak || Spacewatch || — || align=right | 3.7 km || 
|-id=403 bgcolor=#E9E9E9
| 166403 ||  || — || July 9, 2002 || Palomar || NEAT || — || align=right | 4.0 km || 
|-id=404 bgcolor=#E9E9E9
| 166404 ||  || — || July 14, 2002 || Palomar || NEAT || — || align=right | 3.8 km || 
|-id=405 bgcolor=#E9E9E9
| 166405 ||  || — || July 12, 2002 || Palomar || NEAT || — || align=right | 3.3 km || 
|-id=406 bgcolor=#E9E9E9
| 166406 ||  || — || July 14, 2002 || Socorro || LINEAR || — || align=right | 4.7 km || 
|-id=407 bgcolor=#E9E9E9
| 166407 ||  || — || July 14, 2002 || Palomar || NEAT || — || align=right | 3.0 km || 
|-id=408 bgcolor=#E9E9E9
| 166408 ||  || — || July 4, 2002 || Palomar || NEAT || MIS || align=right | 3.3 km || 
|-id=409 bgcolor=#E9E9E9
| 166409 || 2002 OP || — || July 17, 2002 || Socorro || LINEAR || — || align=right | 2.3 km || 
|-id=410 bgcolor=#E9E9E9
| 166410 ||  || — || July 17, 2002 || Socorro || LINEAR || MAR || align=right | 2.6 km || 
|-id=411 bgcolor=#E9E9E9
| 166411 ||  || — || July 17, 2002 || Socorro || LINEAR || — || align=right | 4.0 km || 
|-id=412 bgcolor=#E9E9E9
| 166412 ||  || — || July 17, 2002 || Socorro || LINEAR || MAR || align=right | 2.0 km || 
|-id=413 bgcolor=#E9E9E9
| 166413 ||  || — || July 20, 2002 || Palomar || NEAT || — || align=right | 3.3 km || 
|-id=414 bgcolor=#E9E9E9
| 166414 ||  || — || July 18, 2002 || Socorro || LINEAR || — || align=right | 1.9 km || 
|-id=415 bgcolor=#E9E9E9
| 166415 ||  || — || July 18, 2002 || Socorro || LINEAR || — || align=right | 3.3 km || 
|-id=416 bgcolor=#E9E9E9
| 166416 ||  || — || July 18, 2002 || Socorro || LINEAR || — || align=right | 4.3 km || 
|-id=417 bgcolor=#E9E9E9
| 166417 ||  || — || July 18, 2002 || Socorro || LINEAR || — || align=right | 2.1 km || 
|-id=418 bgcolor=#E9E9E9
| 166418 ||  || — || July 18, 2002 || Socorro || LINEAR || ADE || align=right | 4.1 km || 
|-id=419 bgcolor=#E9E9E9
| 166419 ||  || — || July 29, 2002 || Palomar || S. F. Hönig || — || align=right | 1.8 km || 
|-id=420 bgcolor=#E9E9E9
| 166420 ||  || — || July 23, 2002 || Palomar || NEAT || GEF || align=right | 2.2 km || 
|-id=421 bgcolor=#d6d6d6
| 166421 ||  || — || July 22, 2002 || Palomar || NEAT || — || align=right | 2.8 km || 
|-id=422 bgcolor=#d6d6d6
| 166422 ||  || — || August 5, 2002 || Emerald Lane || L. Ball || TRP || align=right | 5.4 km || 
|-id=423 bgcolor=#E9E9E9
| 166423 ||  || — || August 5, 2002 || Reedy Creek || J. Broughton || DOR || align=right | 4.9 km || 
|-id=424 bgcolor=#E9E9E9
| 166424 ||  || — || August 3, 2002 || Palomar || NEAT || — || align=right | 2.4 km || 
|-id=425 bgcolor=#E9E9E9
| 166425 ||  || — || August 4, 2002 || Palomar || NEAT || — || align=right | 2.2 km || 
|-id=426 bgcolor=#E9E9E9
| 166426 ||  || — || August 5, 2002 || Palomar || NEAT || WIT || align=right | 4.4 km || 
|-id=427 bgcolor=#E9E9E9
| 166427 ||  || — || August 6, 2002 || Palomar || NEAT || — || align=right | 2.7 km || 
|-id=428 bgcolor=#E9E9E9
| 166428 ||  || — || August 6, 2002 || Palomar || NEAT || NEM || align=right | 3.9 km || 
|-id=429 bgcolor=#E9E9E9
| 166429 ||  || — || August 6, 2002 || Palomar || NEAT || — || align=right | 3.3 km || 
|-id=430 bgcolor=#E9E9E9
| 166430 ||  || — || August 6, 2002 || Palomar || NEAT || — || align=right | 3.2 km || 
|-id=431 bgcolor=#E9E9E9
| 166431 ||  || — || August 6, 2002 || Palomar || NEAT || AGN || align=right | 1.9 km || 
|-id=432 bgcolor=#E9E9E9
| 166432 ||  || — || August 6, 2002 || Palomar || NEAT || — || align=right | 1.3 km || 
|-id=433 bgcolor=#E9E9E9
| 166433 ||  || — || August 6, 2002 || Palomar || NEAT || — || align=right | 3.4 km || 
|-id=434 bgcolor=#E9E9E9
| 166434 ||  || — || August 6, 2002 || Palomar || NEAT || — || align=right | 4.3 km || 
|-id=435 bgcolor=#E9E9E9
| 166435 ||  || — || August 6, 2002 || Palomar || NEAT || GEF || align=right | 2.2 km || 
|-id=436 bgcolor=#E9E9E9
| 166436 ||  || — || August 6, 2002 || Palomar || NEAT || — || align=right | 4.0 km || 
|-id=437 bgcolor=#E9E9E9
| 166437 ||  || — || August 5, 2002 || Campo Imperatore || CINEOS || — || align=right | 4.3 km || 
|-id=438 bgcolor=#E9E9E9
| 166438 ||  || — || August 6, 2002 || Campo Imperatore || CINEOS || — || align=right | 4.1 km || 
|-id=439 bgcolor=#E9E9E9
| 166439 ||  || — || August 6, 2002 || Palomar || NEAT || AGN || align=right | 2.2 km || 
|-id=440 bgcolor=#E9E9E9
| 166440 ||  || — || August 8, 2002 || Palomar || NEAT || — || align=right | 3.2 km || 
|-id=441 bgcolor=#E9E9E9
| 166441 ||  || — || August 7, 2002 || Palomar || NEAT || WIT || align=right | 1.8 km || 
|-id=442 bgcolor=#E9E9E9
| 166442 ||  || — || August 8, 2002 || Palomar || NEAT || — || align=right | 3.0 km || 
|-id=443 bgcolor=#E9E9E9
| 166443 ||  || — || August 8, 2002 || Palomar || NEAT || — || align=right | 3.0 km || 
|-id=444 bgcolor=#E9E9E9
| 166444 ||  || — || August 11, 2002 || Needville || Needville Obs. || — || align=right | 5.4 km || 
|-id=445 bgcolor=#E9E9E9
| 166445 ||  || — || August 9, 2002 || Socorro || LINEAR || — || align=right | 3.4 km || 
|-id=446 bgcolor=#E9E9E9
| 166446 ||  || — || August 10, 2002 || Socorro || LINEAR || HNS || align=right | 2.2 km || 
|-id=447 bgcolor=#E9E9E9
| 166447 ||  || — || August 10, 2002 || Socorro || LINEAR || — || align=right | 5.2 km || 
|-id=448 bgcolor=#E9E9E9
| 166448 ||  || — || August 11, 2002 || Socorro || LINEAR || — || align=right | 6.5 km || 
|-id=449 bgcolor=#E9E9E9
| 166449 ||  || — || August 11, 2002 || Socorro || LINEAR || — || align=right | 4.7 km || 
|-id=450 bgcolor=#E9E9E9
| 166450 ||  || — || August 12, 2002 || Socorro || LINEAR || CLO || align=right | 3.2 km || 
|-id=451 bgcolor=#E9E9E9
| 166451 ||  || — || August 12, 2002 || Socorro || LINEAR || — || align=right | 2.6 km || 
|-id=452 bgcolor=#E9E9E9
| 166452 ||  || — || August 12, 2002 || Socorro || LINEAR || EUN || align=right | 1.9 km || 
|-id=453 bgcolor=#E9E9E9
| 166453 ||  || — || August 8, 2002 || Palomar || NEAT || — || align=right | 2.4 km || 
|-id=454 bgcolor=#E9E9E9
| 166454 ||  || — || August 8, 2002 || Palomar || NEAT || HEN || align=right | 1.6 km || 
|-id=455 bgcolor=#E9E9E9
| 166455 ||  || — || August 11, 2002 || Palomar || NEAT || — || align=right | 4.1 km || 
|-id=456 bgcolor=#E9E9E9
| 166456 ||  || — || August 11, 2002 || Haleakala || NEAT || — || align=right | 4.2 km || 
|-id=457 bgcolor=#E9E9E9
| 166457 ||  || — || August 11, 2002 || Palomar || NEAT || DOR || align=right | 4.9 km || 
|-id=458 bgcolor=#E9E9E9
| 166458 ||  || — || August 9, 2002 || Socorro || LINEAR || — || align=right | 3.5 km || 
|-id=459 bgcolor=#E9E9E9
| 166459 ||  || — || August 11, 2002 || Socorro || LINEAR || — || align=right | 4.4 km || 
|-id=460 bgcolor=#E9E9E9
| 166460 ||  || — || August 11, 2002 || Socorro || LINEAR || — || align=right | 3.9 km || 
|-id=461 bgcolor=#E9E9E9
| 166461 ||  || — || August 11, 2002 || Socorro || LINEAR || ADE || align=right | 3.9 km || 
|-id=462 bgcolor=#E9E9E9
| 166462 ||  || — || August 14, 2002 || Palomar || NEAT || — || align=right | 3.5 km || 
|-id=463 bgcolor=#d6d6d6
| 166463 ||  || — || August 14, 2002 || Palomar || NEAT || — || align=right | 5.3 km || 
|-id=464 bgcolor=#E9E9E9
| 166464 ||  || — || August 14, 2002 || Socorro || LINEAR || — || align=right | 2.8 km || 
|-id=465 bgcolor=#E9E9E9
| 166465 ||  || — || August 14, 2002 || Socorro || LINEAR || GEF || align=right | 2.4 km || 
|-id=466 bgcolor=#E9E9E9
| 166466 ||  || — || August 14, 2002 || Socorro || LINEAR || JUN || align=right | 1.9 km || 
|-id=467 bgcolor=#E9E9E9
| 166467 ||  || — || August 11, 2002 || Palomar || NEAT || HEN || align=right | 1.7 km || 
|-id=468 bgcolor=#E9E9E9
| 166468 ||  || — || August 12, 2002 || Socorro || LINEAR || — || align=right | 2.9 km || 
|-id=469 bgcolor=#E9E9E9
| 166469 ||  || — || August 13, 2002 || Socorro || LINEAR || — || align=right | 3.9 km || 
|-id=470 bgcolor=#E9E9E9
| 166470 ||  || — || August 13, 2002 || Socorro || LINEAR || — || align=right | 1.9 km || 
|-id=471 bgcolor=#E9E9E9
| 166471 ||  || — || August 13, 2002 || Socorro || LINEAR || WIT || align=right | 1.7 km || 
|-id=472 bgcolor=#d6d6d6
| 166472 ||  || — || August 13, 2002 || Socorro || LINEAR || BRA || align=right | 2.9 km || 
|-id=473 bgcolor=#E9E9E9
| 166473 ||  || — || August 15, 2002 || Socorro || LINEAR || — || align=right | 2.9 km || 
|-id=474 bgcolor=#E9E9E9
| 166474 ||  || — || August 13, 2002 || Anderson Mesa || LONEOS || — || align=right | 4.4 km || 
|-id=475 bgcolor=#E9E9E9
| 166475 ||  || — || August 13, 2002 || Anderson Mesa || LONEOS || HOF || align=right | 5.0 km || 
|-id=476 bgcolor=#E9E9E9
| 166476 ||  || — || August 13, 2002 || Anderson Mesa || LONEOS || DOR || align=right | 3.5 km || 
|-id=477 bgcolor=#E9E9E9
| 166477 ||  || — || August 14, 2002 || Socorro || LINEAR || — || align=right | 3.5 km || 
|-id=478 bgcolor=#d6d6d6
| 166478 ||  || — || August 14, 2002 || Socorro || LINEAR || TIR || align=right | 5.7 km || 
|-id=479 bgcolor=#E9E9E9
| 166479 ||  || — || August 13, 2002 || Kitt Peak || Spacewatch || WIT || align=right | 1.7 km || 
|-id=480 bgcolor=#E9E9E9
| 166480 ||  || — || August 13, 2002 || Anderson Mesa || LONEOS || — || align=right | 3.6 km || 
|-id=481 bgcolor=#E9E9E9
| 166481 ||  || — || August 15, 2002 || Anderson Mesa || LONEOS || — || align=right | 3.5 km || 
|-id=482 bgcolor=#E9E9E9
| 166482 ||  || — || August 15, 2002 || Socorro || LINEAR || PAD || align=right | 4.6 km || 
|-id=483 bgcolor=#E9E9E9
| 166483 ||  || — || August 15, 2002 || Kitt Peak || Spacewatch || — || align=right | 3.7 km || 
|-id=484 bgcolor=#E9E9E9
| 166484 ||  || — || August 11, 2002 || Haleakala || NEAT || — || align=right | 3.1 km || 
|-id=485 bgcolor=#E9E9E9
| 166485 ||  || — || August 14, 2002 || Siding Spring || R. H. McNaught || POS || align=right | 5.7 km || 
|-id=486 bgcolor=#E9E9E9
| 166486 ||  || — || August 6, 2002 || Palomar || NEAT || HEN || align=right | 3.9 km || 
|-id=487 bgcolor=#E9E9E9
| 166487 ||  || — || August 8, 2002 || Palomar || S. F. Hönig || — || align=right | 4.1 km || 
|-id=488 bgcolor=#E9E9E9
| 166488 ||  || — || August 8, 2002 || Palomar || S. F. Hönig || WIT || align=right | 1.8 km || 
|-id=489 bgcolor=#E9E9E9
| 166489 ||  || — || August 8, 2002 || Palomar || S. F. Hönig || — || align=right | 3.1 km || 
|-id=490 bgcolor=#E9E9E9
| 166490 ||  || — || August 8, 2002 || Palomar || S. F. Hönig || AGN || align=right | 1.8 km || 
|-id=491 bgcolor=#E9E9E9
| 166491 ||  || — || August 8, 2002 || Palomar || S. F. Hönig || AGN || align=right | 1.5 km || 
|-id=492 bgcolor=#E9E9E9
| 166492 ||  || — || August 8, 2002 || Palomar || S. F. Hönig || AST || align=right | 3.1 km || 
|-id=493 bgcolor=#E9E9E9
| 166493 ||  || — || August 8, 2002 || Palomar || NEAT || — || align=right | 1.8 km || 
|-id=494 bgcolor=#E9E9E9
| 166494 ||  || — || August 8, 2002 || Palomar || NEAT || GEF || align=right | 2.0 km || 
|-id=495 bgcolor=#E9E9E9
| 166495 ||  || — || August 8, 2002 || Palomar || NEAT || — || align=right | 2.8 km || 
|-id=496 bgcolor=#E9E9E9
| 166496 ||  || — || August 11, 2002 || Palomar || NEAT || AST || align=right | 1.8 km || 
|-id=497 bgcolor=#E9E9E9
| 166497 ||  || — || August 16, 2002 || Palomar || NEAT || — || align=right | 4.1 km || 
|-id=498 bgcolor=#E9E9E9
| 166498 ||  || — || August 19, 2002 || Palomar || NEAT || — || align=right | 4.8 km || 
|-id=499 bgcolor=#E9E9E9
| 166499 ||  || — || August 26, 2002 || Palomar || NEAT || WIT || align=right | 2.1 km || 
|-id=500 bgcolor=#d6d6d6
| 166500 ||  || — || August 27, 2002 || Palomar || NEAT || EMA || align=right | 6.7 km || 
|}

166501–166600 

|-bgcolor=#E9E9E9
| 166501 ||  || — || August 26, 2002 || Palomar || NEAT || AGN || align=right | 2.4 km || 
|-id=502 bgcolor=#E9E9E9
| 166502 ||  || — || August 26, 2002 || Palomar || NEAT || — || align=right | 4.5 km || 
|-id=503 bgcolor=#E9E9E9
| 166503 ||  || — || August 27, 2002 || Palomar || NEAT || XIZ || align=right | 2.7 km || 
|-id=504 bgcolor=#d6d6d6
| 166504 ||  || — || August 28, 2002 || Palomar || NEAT || KOR || align=right | 2.6 km || 
|-id=505 bgcolor=#E9E9E9
| 166505 ||  || — || August 27, 2002 || Palomar || NEAT || PAD || align=right | 5.2 km || 
|-id=506 bgcolor=#E9E9E9
| 166506 ||  || — || August 29, 2002 || Palomar || NEAT || — || align=right | 4.0 km || 
|-id=507 bgcolor=#E9E9E9
| 166507 ||  || — || August 29, 2002 || Palomar || NEAT || HEN || align=right | 2.0 km || 
|-id=508 bgcolor=#E9E9E9
| 166508 ||  || — || August 29, 2002 || Palomar || NEAT || WIT || align=right | 2.0 km || 
|-id=509 bgcolor=#E9E9E9
| 166509 ||  || — || August 29, 2002 || Palomar || NEAT || GEF || align=right | 2.2 km || 
|-id=510 bgcolor=#E9E9E9
| 166510 ||  || — || August 29, 2002 || Palomar || NEAT || PAD || align=right | 2.9 km || 
|-id=511 bgcolor=#E9E9E9
| 166511 ||  || — || August 29, 2002 || Palomar || NEAT || — || align=right | 1.5 km || 
|-id=512 bgcolor=#E9E9E9
| 166512 ||  || — || August 30, 2002 || Palomar || NEAT || — || align=right | 3.4 km || 
|-id=513 bgcolor=#d6d6d6
| 166513 ||  || — || August 31, 2002 || Kitt Peak || Spacewatch || — || align=right | 4.3 km || 
|-id=514 bgcolor=#d6d6d6
| 166514 ||  || — || August 29, 2002 || Palomar || S. F. Hönig || KAR || align=right | 1.6 km || 
|-id=515 bgcolor=#E9E9E9
| 166515 ||  || — || August 28, 2002 || Palomar || NEAT || — || align=right | 2.7 km || 
|-id=516 bgcolor=#E9E9E9
| 166516 ||  || — || August 27, 2002 || Palomar || NEAT || AEO || align=right | 1.7 km || 
|-id=517 bgcolor=#d6d6d6
| 166517 ||  || — || August 17, 2002 || Palomar || NEAT || EOS || align=right | 3.2 km || 
|-id=518 bgcolor=#d6d6d6
| 166518 ||  || — || August 19, 2002 || Palomar || NEAT || KOR || align=right | 1.7 km || 
|-id=519 bgcolor=#E9E9E9
| 166519 ||  || — || August 18, 2002 || Palomar || NEAT || HOF || align=right | 4.3 km || 
|-id=520 bgcolor=#E9E9E9
| 166520 ||  || — || August 16, 2002 || Palomar || NEAT || — || align=right | 3.2 km || 
|-id=521 bgcolor=#E9E9E9
| 166521 ||  || — || August 18, 2002 || Palomar || NEAT || — || align=right | 3.1 km || 
|-id=522 bgcolor=#E9E9E9
| 166522 ||  || — || August 19, 2002 || Palomar || NEAT || — || align=right | 4.1 km || 
|-id=523 bgcolor=#E9E9E9
| 166523 ||  || — || August 18, 2002 || Palomar || NEAT || HEN || align=right | 1.7 km || 
|-id=524 bgcolor=#E9E9E9
| 166524 ||  || — || August 19, 2002 || Palomar || NEAT || — || align=right | 4.4 km || 
|-id=525 bgcolor=#E9E9E9
| 166525 ||  || — || August 17, 2002 || Palomar || NEAT || AGN || align=right | 1.7 km || 
|-id=526 bgcolor=#E9E9E9
| 166526 || 2002 RK || — || September 2, 2002 || Ondřejov || P. Kušnirák, P. Pravec || AGN || align=right | 1.8 km || 
|-id=527 bgcolor=#E9E9E9
| 166527 ||  || — || September 1, 2002 || Palomar || NEAT || — || align=right | 3.8 km || 
|-id=528 bgcolor=#E9E9E9
| 166528 ||  || — || September 1, 2002 || Kvistaberg || UDAS || — || align=right | 3.9 km || 
|-id=529 bgcolor=#E9E9E9
| 166529 ||  || — || September 3, 2002 || Haleakala || NEAT || GEF || align=right | 2.6 km || 
|-id=530 bgcolor=#E9E9E9
| 166530 ||  || — || September 4, 2002 || Palomar || NEAT || AST || align=right | 5.0 km || 
|-id=531 bgcolor=#d6d6d6
| 166531 ||  || — || September 4, 2002 || Palomar || NEAT || — || align=right | 3.3 km || 
|-id=532 bgcolor=#d6d6d6
| 166532 ||  || — || September 4, 2002 || Nashville || R. Clingan || — || align=right | 3.9 km || 
|-id=533 bgcolor=#E9E9E9
| 166533 ||  || — || September 4, 2002 || Anderson Mesa || LONEOS || PAE || align=right | 4.8 km || 
|-id=534 bgcolor=#d6d6d6
| 166534 ||  || — || September 4, 2002 || Anderson Mesa || LONEOS || — || align=right | 4.2 km || 
|-id=535 bgcolor=#E9E9E9
| 166535 ||  || — || September 4, 2002 || Anderson Mesa || LONEOS || — || align=right | 5.2 km || 
|-id=536 bgcolor=#d6d6d6
| 166536 ||  || — || September 4, 2002 || Anderson Mesa || LONEOS || CHA || align=right | 3.0 km || 
|-id=537 bgcolor=#E9E9E9
| 166537 ||  || — || September 4, 2002 || Ondřejov || P. Kušnirák || AGN || align=right | 1.8 km || 
|-id=538 bgcolor=#E9E9E9
| 166538 ||  || — || September 4, 2002 || Anderson Mesa || LONEOS || GEF || align=right | 2.6 km || 
|-id=539 bgcolor=#E9E9E9
| 166539 ||  || — || September 4, 2002 || Anderson Mesa || LONEOS || GEF || align=right | 2.4 km || 
|-id=540 bgcolor=#d6d6d6
| 166540 ||  || — || September 4, 2002 || Anderson Mesa || LONEOS || EOS || align=right | 6.1 km || 
|-id=541 bgcolor=#d6d6d6
| 166541 ||  || — || September 5, 2002 || Anderson Mesa || LONEOS || — || align=right | 5.4 km || 
|-id=542 bgcolor=#E9E9E9
| 166542 ||  || — || September 5, 2002 || Socorro || LINEAR || MIS || align=right | 3.6 km || 
|-id=543 bgcolor=#E9E9E9
| 166543 ||  || — || September 5, 2002 || Socorro || LINEAR || MRX || align=right | 2.2 km || 
|-id=544 bgcolor=#d6d6d6
| 166544 ||  || — || September 5, 2002 || Socorro || LINEAR || — || align=right | 2.9 km || 
|-id=545 bgcolor=#d6d6d6
| 166545 ||  || — || September 5, 2002 || Socorro || LINEAR || — || align=right | 3.8 km || 
|-id=546 bgcolor=#E9E9E9
| 166546 ||  || — || September 5, 2002 || Anderson Mesa || LONEOS || — || align=right | 2.7 km || 
|-id=547 bgcolor=#E9E9E9
| 166547 ||  || — || September 5, 2002 || Anderson Mesa || LONEOS || MRX || align=right | 2.0 km || 
|-id=548 bgcolor=#E9E9E9
| 166548 ||  || — || September 5, 2002 || Anderson Mesa || LONEOS || — || align=right | 4.2 km || 
|-id=549 bgcolor=#E9E9E9
| 166549 ||  || — || September 5, 2002 || Anderson Mesa || LONEOS || — || align=right | 5.1 km || 
|-id=550 bgcolor=#E9E9E9
| 166550 ||  || — || September 3, 2002 || Palomar || NEAT || DOR || align=right | 6.4 km || 
|-id=551 bgcolor=#E9E9E9
| 166551 ||  || — || September 4, 2002 || Anderson Mesa || LONEOS || — || align=right | 4.9 km || 
|-id=552 bgcolor=#d6d6d6
| 166552 ||  || — || September 5, 2002 || Socorro || LINEAR || KOR || align=right | 2.9 km || 
|-id=553 bgcolor=#fefefe
| 166553 ||  || — || September 5, 2002 || Socorro || LINEAR || H || align=right | 1.1 km || 
|-id=554 bgcolor=#E9E9E9
| 166554 ||  || — || September 5, 2002 || Socorro || LINEAR || — || align=right | 3.1 km || 
|-id=555 bgcolor=#d6d6d6
| 166555 ||  || — || September 5, 2002 || Socorro || LINEAR || — || align=right | 4.1 km || 
|-id=556 bgcolor=#d6d6d6
| 166556 ||  || — || September 5, 2002 || Socorro || LINEAR || — || align=right | 6.0 km || 
|-id=557 bgcolor=#d6d6d6
| 166557 ||  || — || September 5, 2002 || Anderson Mesa || LONEOS || IMH || align=right | 3.7 km || 
|-id=558 bgcolor=#FA8072
| 166558 ||  || — || September 5, 2002 || Socorro || LINEAR || H || align=right data-sort-value="0.89" | 890 m || 
|-id=559 bgcolor=#d6d6d6
| 166559 ||  || — || September 5, 2002 || Socorro || LINEAR || TIR || align=right | 3.7 km || 
|-id=560 bgcolor=#d6d6d6
| 166560 ||  || — || September 5, 2002 || Socorro || LINEAR || — || align=right | 5.7 km || 
|-id=561 bgcolor=#d6d6d6
| 166561 ||  || — || September 5, 2002 || Socorro || LINEAR || — || align=right | 7.8 km || 
|-id=562 bgcolor=#d6d6d6
| 166562 ||  || — || September 5, 2002 || Socorro || LINEAR || — || align=right | 6.5 km || 
|-id=563 bgcolor=#d6d6d6
| 166563 ||  || — || September 5, 2002 || Socorro || LINEAR || — || align=right | 5.4 km || 
|-id=564 bgcolor=#d6d6d6
| 166564 ||  || — || September 5, 2002 || Socorro || LINEAR || Tj (2.97) || align=right | 7.7 km || 
|-id=565 bgcolor=#E9E9E9
| 166565 ||  || — || September 6, 2002 || Socorro || LINEAR || — || align=right | 3.4 km || 
|-id=566 bgcolor=#d6d6d6
| 166566 ||  || — || September 6, 2002 || Socorro || LINEAR || 629 || align=right | 3.1 km || 
|-id=567 bgcolor=#d6d6d6
| 166567 ||  || — || September 5, 2002 || Anderson Mesa || LONEOS || KOR || align=right | 2.4 km || 
|-id=568 bgcolor=#E9E9E9
| 166568 ||  || — || September 5, 2002 || Socorro || LINEAR || PAD || align=right | 4.1 km || 
|-id=569 bgcolor=#E9E9E9
| 166569 ||  || — || September 6, 2002 || Socorro || LINEAR || PAD || align=right | 5.1 km || 
|-id=570 bgcolor=#d6d6d6
| 166570 Adolfträger ||  ||  || September 8, 2002 || Kleť || KLENOT || — || align=right | 6.7 km || 
|-id=571 bgcolor=#E9E9E9
| 166571 ||  || — || September 3, 2002 || Campo Imperatore || CINEOS || MRX || align=right | 1.8 km || 
|-id=572 bgcolor=#d6d6d6
| 166572 ||  || — || September 7, 2002 || Socorro || LINEAR || — || align=right | 4.4 km || 
|-id=573 bgcolor=#E9E9E9
| 166573 ||  || — || September 8, 2002 || Haleakala || NEAT || — || align=right | 4.5 km || 
|-id=574 bgcolor=#E9E9E9
| 166574 ||  || — || September 10, 2002 || Palomar || NEAT || — || align=right | 3.3 km || 
|-id=575 bgcolor=#E9E9E9
| 166575 ||  || — || September 10, 2002 || Palomar || NEAT || — || align=right | 2.8 km || 
|-id=576 bgcolor=#E9E9E9
| 166576 ||  || — || September 10, 2002 || Haleakala || NEAT || — || align=right | 4.4 km || 
|-id=577 bgcolor=#d6d6d6
| 166577 ||  || — || September 10, 2002 || Palomar || NEAT || NAE || align=right | 5.9 km || 
|-id=578 bgcolor=#d6d6d6
| 166578 ||  || — || September 10, 2002 || Palomar || NEAT || EOS || align=right | 3.3 km || 
|-id=579 bgcolor=#E9E9E9
| 166579 ||  || — || September 10, 2002 || Palomar || NEAT || CLO || align=right | 3.9 km || 
|-id=580 bgcolor=#E9E9E9
| 166580 ||  || — || September 11, 2002 || Haleakala || NEAT || — || align=right | 4.2 km || 
|-id=581 bgcolor=#E9E9E9
| 166581 ||  || — || September 10, 2002 || Palomar || NEAT || — || align=right | 3.0 km || 
|-id=582 bgcolor=#d6d6d6
| 166582 ||  || — || September 11, 2002 || Haleakala || NEAT || KOR || align=right | 2.1 km || 
|-id=583 bgcolor=#E9E9E9
| 166583 ||  || — || September 11, 2002 || Haleakala || NEAT || — || align=right | 4.3 km || 
|-id=584 bgcolor=#d6d6d6
| 166584 ||  || — || September 11, 2002 || Palomar || NEAT || — || align=right | 3.1 km || 
|-id=585 bgcolor=#E9E9E9
| 166585 ||  || — || September 11, 2002 || Palomar || NEAT || — || align=right | 4.1 km || 
|-id=586 bgcolor=#E9E9E9
| 166586 ||  || — || September 12, 2002 || Palomar || NEAT || HEN || align=right | 1.5 km || 
|-id=587 bgcolor=#E9E9E9
| 166587 ||  || — || September 12, 2002 || Palomar || NEAT || — || align=right | 2.4 km || 
|-id=588 bgcolor=#d6d6d6
| 166588 ||  || — || September 12, 2002 || Palomar || NEAT || — || align=right | 3.1 km || 
|-id=589 bgcolor=#E9E9E9
| 166589 ||  || — || September 12, 2002 || Palomar || NEAT || CLO || align=right | 3.9 km || 
|-id=590 bgcolor=#d6d6d6
| 166590 ||  || — || September 13, 2002 || Palomar || NEAT || KOR || align=right | 2.2 km || 
|-id=591 bgcolor=#d6d6d6
| 166591 ||  || — || September 13, 2002 || Palomar || NEAT || — || align=right | 3.3 km || 
|-id=592 bgcolor=#E9E9E9
| 166592 ||  || — || September 13, 2002 || Socorro || LINEAR || DOR || align=right | 4.8 km || 
|-id=593 bgcolor=#d6d6d6
| 166593 ||  || — || September 13, 2002 || Kitt Peak || Spacewatch || — || align=right | 3.7 km || 
|-id=594 bgcolor=#d6d6d6
| 166594 ||  || — || September 13, 2002 || Kitt Peak || Spacewatch || — || align=right | 4.1 km || 
|-id=595 bgcolor=#d6d6d6
| 166595 ||  || — || September 14, 2002 || Kitt Peak || Spacewatch || KAR || align=right | 2.0 km || 
|-id=596 bgcolor=#d6d6d6
| 166596 ||  || — || September 14, 2002 || Kitt Peak || Spacewatch || — || align=right | 3.3 km || 
|-id=597 bgcolor=#E9E9E9
| 166597 ||  || — || September 12, 2002 || Palomar || NEAT || — || align=right | 4.9 km || 
|-id=598 bgcolor=#E9E9E9
| 166598 ||  || — || September 12, 2002 || Haleakala || NEAT || GEF || align=right | 2.7 km || 
|-id=599 bgcolor=#d6d6d6
| 166599 ||  || — || September 13, 2002 || Palomar || NEAT || — || align=right | 4.5 km || 
|-id=600 bgcolor=#E9E9E9
| 166600 ||  || — || September 14, 2002 || Palomar || NEAT || — || align=right | 3.4 km || 
|}

166601–166700 

|-bgcolor=#E9E9E9
| 166601 ||  || — || September 13, 2002 || Kitt Peak || Spacewatch || — || align=right | 2.5 km || 
|-id=602 bgcolor=#E9E9E9
| 166602 ||  || — || September 14, 2002 || Haleakala || NEAT || — || align=right | 2.6 km || 
|-id=603 bgcolor=#E9E9E9
| 166603 ||  || — || September 12, 2002 || Palomar || NEAT || — || align=right | 2.2 km || 
|-id=604 bgcolor=#d6d6d6
| 166604 ||  || — || September 14, 2002 || Palomar || NEAT || — || align=right | 3.4 km || 
|-id=605 bgcolor=#d6d6d6
| 166605 ||  || — || September 15, 2002 || Palomar || NEAT || — || align=right | 4.1 km || 
|-id=606 bgcolor=#fefefe
| 166606 ||  || — || September 14, 2002 || Palomar || NEAT || — || align=right | 1.6 km || 
|-id=607 bgcolor=#d6d6d6
| 166607 ||  || — || September 14, 2002 || Haleakala || NEAT || NAE || align=right | 5.6 km || 
|-id=608 bgcolor=#E9E9E9
| 166608 ||  || — || September 14, 2002 || Palomar || NEAT || HOF || align=right | 4.7 km || 
|-id=609 bgcolor=#d6d6d6
| 166609 ||  || — || September 10, 2002 || Wrightwood || Table Mountain Obs. || — || align=right | 3.9 km || 
|-id=610 bgcolor=#E9E9E9
| 166610 ||  || — || September 14, 2002 || Palomar || R. Matson || — || align=right | 2.0 km || 
|-id=611 bgcolor=#d6d6d6
| 166611 ||  || — || September 1, 2002 || Palomar || S. F. Hönig || — || align=right | 2.7 km || 
|-id=612 bgcolor=#d6d6d6
| 166612 ||  || — || September 14, 2002 || Palomar || NEAT || — || align=right | 3.2 km || 
|-id=613 bgcolor=#E9E9E9
| 166613 ||  || — || September 14, 2002 || Palomar || NEAT || — || align=right | 3.9 km || 
|-id=614 bgcolor=#E9E9E9
| 166614 Zsazsa ||  ||  || September 1, 2002 || Palomar || NEAT || — || align=right | 2.3 km || 
|-id=615 bgcolor=#d6d6d6
| 166615 ||  || — || September 4, 2002 || Palomar || NEAT || — || align=right | 2.7 km || 
|-id=616 bgcolor=#E9E9E9
| 166616 ||  || — || September 4, 2002 || Palomar || NEAT || — || align=right | 4.7 km || 
|-id=617 bgcolor=#d6d6d6
| 166617 ||  || — || September 26, 2002 || Palomar || NEAT || KOR || align=right | 2.5 km || 
|-id=618 bgcolor=#d6d6d6
| 166618 ||  || — || September 27, 2002 || Palomar || NEAT || EOS || align=right | 3.2 km || 
|-id=619 bgcolor=#E9E9E9
| 166619 ||  || — || September 27, 2002 || Palomar || NEAT || MRX || align=right | 2.5 km || 
|-id=620 bgcolor=#d6d6d6
| 166620 ||  || — || September 27, 2002 || Palomar || NEAT || KOR || align=right | 2.3 km || 
|-id=621 bgcolor=#d6d6d6
| 166621 ||  || — || September 27, 2002 || Palomar || NEAT || — || align=right | 4.1 km || 
|-id=622 bgcolor=#d6d6d6
| 166622 Sebastien ||  ||  || September 27, 2002 || Palomar || NEAT || — || align=right | 6.5 km || 
|-id=623 bgcolor=#d6d6d6
| 166623 ||  || — || September 26, 2002 || Palomar || NEAT || — || align=right | 6.0 km || 
|-id=624 bgcolor=#d6d6d6
| 166624 ||  || — || September 26, 2002 || Palomar || NEAT || KOR || align=right | 2.1 km || 
|-id=625 bgcolor=#d6d6d6
| 166625 ||  || — || September 26, 2002 || Palomar || NEAT || — || align=right | 3.7 km || 
|-id=626 bgcolor=#d6d6d6
| 166626 ||  || — || September 26, 2002 || Palomar || NEAT || CHA || align=right | 4.1 km || 
|-id=627 bgcolor=#E9E9E9
| 166627 ||  || — || September 26, 2002 || Palomar || NEAT || DOR || align=right | 4.4 km || 
|-id=628 bgcolor=#d6d6d6
| 166628 ||  || — || September 26, 2002 || Haleakala || NEAT || TRP || align=right | 4.6 km || 
|-id=629 bgcolor=#d6d6d6
| 166629 ||  || — || September 28, 2002 || Palomar || NEAT || KOR || align=right | 3.0 km || 
|-id=630 bgcolor=#d6d6d6
| 166630 ||  || — || September 28, 2002 || Haleakala || NEAT || VER || align=right | 5.4 km || 
|-id=631 bgcolor=#E9E9E9
| 166631 ||  || — || September 28, 2002 || Haleakala || NEAT || — || align=right | 4.0 km || 
|-id=632 bgcolor=#d6d6d6
| 166632 ||  || — || September 28, 2002 || Haleakala || NEAT || — || align=right | 7.0 km || 
|-id=633 bgcolor=#d6d6d6
| 166633 ||  || — || September 28, 2002 || Haleakala || NEAT || — || align=right | 3.4 km || 
|-id=634 bgcolor=#d6d6d6
| 166634 ||  || — || September 28, 2002 || Haleakala || NEAT || — || align=right | 4.8 km || 
|-id=635 bgcolor=#d6d6d6
| 166635 ||  || — || September 29, 2002 || Haleakala || NEAT || — || align=right | 3.3 km || 
|-id=636 bgcolor=#E9E9E9
| 166636 ||  || — || September 30, 2002 || Socorro || LINEAR || HOF || align=right | 4.9 km || 
|-id=637 bgcolor=#d6d6d6
| 166637 ||  || — || September 30, 2002 || Haleakala || NEAT || — || align=right | 6.1 km || 
|-id=638 bgcolor=#E9E9E9
| 166638 ||  || — || September 29, 2002 || Haleakala || NEAT || — || align=right | 3.2 km || 
|-id=639 bgcolor=#d6d6d6
| 166639 ||  || — || September 29, 2002 || Haleakala || NEAT || — || align=right | 6.8 km || 
|-id=640 bgcolor=#d6d6d6
| 166640 ||  || — || September 30, 2002 || Socorro || LINEAR || TEL || align=right | 2.8 km || 
|-id=641 bgcolor=#d6d6d6
| 166641 ||  || — || September 30, 2002 || Socorro || LINEAR || — || align=right | 5.1 km || 
|-id=642 bgcolor=#E9E9E9
| 166642 ||  || — || September 30, 2002 || Socorro || LINEAR || — || align=right | 3.4 km || 
|-id=643 bgcolor=#d6d6d6
| 166643 ||  || — || September 30, 2002 || Socorro || LINEAR || TEL || align=right | 2.8 km || 
|-id=644 bgcolor=#d6d6d6
| 166644 ||  || — || September 30, 2002 || Socorro || LINEAR || THM || align=right | 3.4 km || 
|-id=645 bgcolor=#d6d6d6
| 166645 ||  || — || October 1, 2002 || Anderson Mesa || LONEOS || — || align=right | 6.8 km || 
|-id=646 bgcolor=#d6d6d6
| 166646 ||  || — || October 1, 2002 || Anderson Mesa || LONEOS || LIX || align=right | 6.7 km || 
|-id=647 bgcolor=#d6d6d6
| 166647 ||  || — || October 1, 2002 || Anderson Mesa || LONEOS || KOR || align=right | 3.0 km || 
|-id=648 bgcolor=#E9E9E9
| 166648 ||  || — || October 1, 2002 || Haleakala || NEAT || fast? || align=right | 4.3 km || 
|-id=649 bgcolor=#E9E9E9
| 166649 ||  || — || October 1, 2002 || Anderson Mesa || LONEOS || AGN || align=right | 2.2 km || 
|-id=650 bgcolor=#d6d6d6
| 166650 ||  || — || October 1, 2002 || Anderson Mesa || LONEOS || — || align=right | 5.0 km || 
|-id=651 bgcolor=#E9E9E9
| 166651 ||  || — || October 2, 2002 || Socorro || LINEAR || HOF || align=right | 4.2 km || 
|-id=652 bgcolor=#E9E9E9
| 166652 ||  || — || October 2, 2002 || Socorro || LINEAR || HOF || align=right | 5.4 km || 
|-id=653 bgcolor=#d6d6d6
| 166653 ||  || — || October 2, 2002 || Socorro || LINEAR || KAR || align=right | 1.5 km || 
|-id=654 bgcolor=#d6d6d6
| 166654 ||  || — || October 2, 2002 || Socorro || LINEAR || — || align=right | 6.1 km || 
|-id=655 bgcolor=#d6d6d6
| 166655 ||  || — || October 2, 2002 || Socorro || LINEAR || KOR || align=right | 2.6 km || 
|-id=656 bgcolor=#d6d6d6
| 166656 ||  || — || October 2, 2002 || Socorro || LINEAR || THM || align=right | 3.1 km || 
|-id=657 bgcolor=#d6d6d6
| 166657 ||  || — || October 2, 2002 || Socorro || LINEAR || THM || align=right | 3.6 km || 
|-id=658 bgcolor=#d6d6d6
| 166658 ||  || — || October 2, 2002 || Socorro || LINEAR || — || align=right | 5.9 km || 
|-id=659 bgcolor=#d6d6d6
| 166659 ||  || — || October 2, 2002 || Socorro || LINEAR || — || align=right | 3.7 km || 
|-id=660 bgcolor=#d6d6d6
| 166660 ||  || — || October 2, 2002 || Socorro || LINEAR || KOR || align=right | 1.9 km || 
|-id=661 bgcolor=#d6d6d6
| 166661 ||  || — || October 2, 2002 || Socorro || LINEAR || BRA || align=right | 4.1 km || 
|-id=662 bgcolor=#E9E9E9
| 166662 ||  || — || October 2, 2002 || Haleakala || NEAT || — || align=right | 3.8 km || 
|-id=663 bgcolor=#d6d6d6
| 166663 ||  || — || October 2, 2002 || Socorro || LINEAR || — || align=right | 4.3 km || 
|-id=664 bgcolor=#d6d6d6
| 166664 ||  || — || October 2, 2002 || Socorro || LINEAR || EOS || align=right | 3.5 km || 
|-id=665 bgcolor=#d6d6d6
| 166665 ||  || — || October 1, 2002 || Anderson Mesa || LONEOS || 615 || align=right | 2.6 km || 
|-id=666 bgcolor=#d6d6d6
| 166666 ||  || — || October 2, 2002 || Socorro || LINEAR || — || align=right | 5.1 km || 
|-id=667 bgcolor=#d6d6d6
| 166667 ||  || — || October 2, 2002 || Campo Imperatore || CINEOS || 629 || align=right | 2.0 km || 
|-id=668 bgcolor=#d6d6d6
| 166668 ||  || — || October 1, 2002 || Anderson Mesa || LONEOS || — || align=right | 4.8 km || 
|-id=669 bgcolor=#E9E9E9
| 166669 ||  || — || October 3, 2002 || Campo Imperatore || CINEOS || GEF || align=right | 2.5 km || 
|-id=670 bgcolor=#d6d6d6
| 166670 ||  || — || October 4, 2002 || Socorro || LINEAR || TRP || align=right | 6.1 km || 
|-id=671 bgcolor=#d6d6d6
| 166671 ||  || — || October 3, 2002 || Palomar || NEAT || HYG || align=right | 4.8 km || 
|-id=672 bgcolor=#d6d6d6
| 166672 ||  || — || October 1, 2002 || Anderson Mesa || LONEOS || — || align=right | 4.3 km || 
|-id=673 bgcolor=#d6d6d6
| 166673 ||  || — || October 1, 2002 || Socorro || LINEAR || — || align=right | 6.7 km || 
|-id=674 bgcolor=#d6d6d6
| 166674 ||  || — || October 2, 2002 || Haleakala || NEAT || EOS || align=right | 3.5 km || 
|-id=675 bgcolor=#d6d6d6
| 166675 ||  || — || October 2, 2002 || Campo Imperatore || CINEOS || — || align=right | 3.7 km || 
|-id=676 bgcolor=#d6d6d6
| 166676 ||  || — || October 3, 2002 || Socorro || LINEAR || — || align=right | 4.0 km || 
|-id=677 bgcolor=#d6d6d6
| 166677 ||  || — || October 3, 2002 || Campo Imperatore || CINEOS || HYG || align=right | 5.3 km || 
|-id=678 bgcolor=#d6d6d6
| 166678 ||  || — || October 1, 2002 || Anderson Mesa || LONEOS || — || align=right | 5.4 km || 
|-id=679 bgcolor=#E9E9E9
| 166679 ||  || — || October 2, 2002 || Haleakala || NEAT || — || align=right | 2.8 km || 
|-id=680 bgcolor=#d6d6d6
| 166680 ||  || — || October 2, 2002 || Haleakala || NEAT || — || align=right | 6.3 km || 
|-id=681 bgcolor=#d6d6d6
| 166681 ||  || — || October 3, 2002 || Socorro || LINEAR || EOS || align=right | 2.8 km || 
|-id=682 bgcolor=#d6d6d6
| 166682 ||  || — || October 3, 2002 || Socorro || LINEAR || KOR || align=right | 3.3 km || 
|-id=683 bgcolor=#d6d6d6
| 166683 ||  || — || October 3, 2002 || Palomar || NEAT || NAE || align=right | 7.6 km || 
|-id=684 bgcolor=#d6d6d6
| 166684 ||  || — || October 3, 2002 || Palomar || NEAT || EUP || align=right | 7.3 km || 
|-id=685 bgcolor=#E9E9E9
| 166685 ||  || — || October 3, 2002 || Palomar || NEAT || — || align=right | 4.0 km || 
|-id=686 bgcolor=#d6d6d6
| 166686 ||  || — || October 3, 2002 || Palomar || NEAT || — || align=right | 4.9 km || 
|-id=687 bgcolor=#d6d6d6
| 166687 ||  || — || October 4, 2002 || Socorro || LINEAR || — || align=right | 5.1 km || 
|-id=688 bgcolor=#d6d6d6
| 166688 ||  || — || October 4, 2002 || Palomar || NEAT || EOS || align=right | 3.6 km || 
|-id=689 bgcolor=#d6d6d6
| 166689 ||  || — || October 4, 2002 || Anderson Mesa || LONEOS || EOS || align=right | 3.6 km || 
|-id=690 bgcolor=#d6d6d6
| 166690 ||  || — || October 4, 2002 || Socorro || LINEAR || — || align=right | 5.7 km || 
|-id=691 bgcolor=#d6d6d6
| 166691 ||  || — || October 5, 2002 || Socorro || LINEAR || — || align=right | 4.6 km || 
|-id=692 bgcolor=#E9E9E9
| 166692 ||  || — || October 5, 2002 || Palomar || NEAT || EUN || align=right | 2.0 km || 
|-id=693 bgcolor=#d6d6d6
| 166693 ||  || — || October 5, 2002 || Palomar || NEAT || — || align=right | 2.2 km || 
|-id=694 bgcolor=#d6d6d6
| 166694 ||  || — || October 5, 2002 || Palomar || NEAT || — || align=right | 5.8 km || 
|-id=695 bgcolor=#fefefe
| 166695 ||  || — || October 5, 2002 || Palomar || NEAT || H || align=right | 1.3 km || 
|-id=696 bgcolor=#E9E9E9
| 166696 ||  || — || October 2, 2002 || Haleakala || NEAT || — || align=right | 4.2 km || 
|-id=697 bgcolor=#d6d6d6
| 166697 ||  || — || October 3, 2002 || Palomar || NEAT || — || align=right | 3.5 km || 
|-id=698 bgcolor=#d6d6d6
| 166698 ||  || — || October 4, 2002 || Palomar || NEAT || TIR || align=right | 4.8 km || 
|-id=699 bgcolor=#d6d6d6
| 166699 ||  || — || October 4, 2002 || Socorro || LINEAR || — || align=right | 5.1 km || 
|-id=700 bgcolor=#d6d6d6
| 166700 ||  || — || October 4, 2002 || Socorro || LINEAR || EOS || align=right | 3.0 km || 
|}

166701–166800 

|-bgcolor=#d6d6d6
| 166701 ||  || — || October 4, 2002 || Socorro || LINEAR || — || align=right | 4.2 km || 
|-id=702 bgcolor=#d6d6d6
| 166702 ||  || — || October 11, 2002 || Palomar || NEAT || — || align=right | 6.0 km || 
|-id=703 bgcolor=#d6d6d6
| 166703 ||  || — || October 12, 2002 || Socorro || LINEAR || — || align=right | 6.1 km || 
|-id=704 bgcolor=#d6d6d6
| 166704 ||  || — || October 13, 2002 || Palomar || NEAT || — || align=right | 6.1 km || 
|-id=705 bgcolor=#d6d6d6
| 166705 ||  || — || October 3, 2002 || Socorro || LINEAR || — || align=right | 5.0 km || 
|-id=706 bgcolor=#d6d6d6
| 166706 ||  || — || October 4, 2002 || Socorro || LINEAR || — || align=right | 6.0 km || 
|-id=707 bgcolor=#d6d6d6
| 166707 ||  || — || October 5, 2002 || Anderson Mesa || LONEOS || INA || align=right | 5.0 km || 
|-id=708 bgcolor=#d6d6d6
| 166708 ||  || — || October 3, 2002 || Socorro || LINEAR || — || align=right | 4.7 km || 
|-id=709 bgcolor=#d6d6d6
| 166709 ||  || — || October 5, 2002 || Socorro || LINEAR || — || align=right | 5.2 km || 
|-id=710 bgcolor=#d6d6d6
| 166710 ||  || — || October 5, 2002 || Socorro || LINEAR || — || align=right | 5.1 km || 
|-id=711 bgcolor=#d6d6d6
| 166711 ||  || — || October 10, 2002 || Bergisch Gladbach || W. Bickel || EOS || align=right | 4.1 km || 
|-id=712 bgcolor=#d6d6d6
| 166712 ||  || — || October 4, 2002 || Socorro || LINEAR || — || align=right | 4.8 km || 
|-id=713 bgcolor=#E9E9E9
| 166713 ||  || — || October 4, 2002 || Socorro || LINEAR || — || align=right | 4.5 km || 
|-id=714 bgcolor=#d6d6d6
| 166714 ||  || — || October 4, 2002 || Socorro || LINEAR || — || align=right | 6.3 km || 
|-id=715 bgcolor=#d6d6d6
| 166715 ||  || — || October 4, 2002 || Socorro || LINEAR || EOS || align=right | 4.0 km || 
|-id=716 bgcolor=#d6d6d6
| 166716 ||  || — || October 5, 2002 || Socorro || LINEAR || — || align=right | 4.7 km || 
|-id=717 bgcolor=#d6d6d6
| 166717 ||  || — || October 7, 2002 || Socorro || LINEAR || EOS || align=right | 3.2 km || 
|-id=718 bgcolor=#d6d6d6
| 166718 ||  || — || October 3, 2002 || Socorro || LINEAR || — || align=right | 3.7 km || 
|-id=719 bgcolor=#d6d6d6
| 166719 ||  || — || October 8, 2002 || Kitt Peak || Spacewatch || — || align=right | 3.8 km || 
|-id=720 bgcolor=#d6d6d6
| 166720 ||  || — || October 8, 2002 || Anderson Mesa || LONEOS || HYG || align=right | 5.8 km || 
|-id=721 bgcolor=#d6d6d6
| 166721 ||  || — || October 8, 2002 || Anderson Mesa || LONEOS || — || align=right | 5.5 km || 
|-id=722 bgcolor=#d6d6d6
| 166722 ||  || — || October 7, 2002 || Socorro || LINEAR || — || align=right | 4.8 km || 
|-id=723 bgcolor=#d6d6d6
| 166723 ||  || — || October 7, 2002 || Socorro || LINEAR || — || align=right | 6.2 km || 
|-id=724 bgcolor=#d6d6d6
| 166724 ||  || — || October 9, 2002 || Anderson Mesa || LONEOS || — || align=right | 5.0 km || 
|-id=725 bgcolor=#d6d6d6
| 166725 ||  || — || October 7, 2002 || Socorro || LINEAR || — || align=right | 4.8 km || 
|-id=726 bgcolor=#d6d6d6
| 166726 ||  || — || October 9, 2002 || Socorro || LINEAR || EMA || align=right | 6.1 km || 
|-id=727 bgcolor=#d6d6d6
| 166727 ||  || — || October 9, 2002 || Socorro || LINEAR || EUP || align=right | 6.3 km || 
|-id=728 bgcolor=#d6d6d6
| 166728 ||  || — || October 7, 2002 || Socorro || LINEAR || THM || align=right | 5.5 km || 
|-id=729 bgcolor=#d6d6d6
| 166729 ||  || — || October 7, 2002 || Haleakala || NEAT || — || align=right | 5.5 km || 
|-id=730 bgcolor=#d6d6d6
| 166730 ||  || — || October 9, 2002 || Socorro || LINEAR || KOR || align=right | 2.0 km || 
|-id=731 bgcolor=#d6d6d6
| 166731 ||  || — || October 9, 2002 || Socorro || LINEAR || — || align=right | 5.3 km || 
|-id=732 bgcolor=#d6d6d6
| 166732 ||  || — || October 9, 2002 || Socorro || LINEAR || — || align=right | 4.4 km || 
|-id=733 bgcolor=#d6d6d6
| 166733 ||  || — || October 9, 2002 || Socorro || LINEAR || — || align=right | 5.1 km || 
|-id=734 bgcolor=#d6d6d6
| 166734 ||  || — || October 9, 2002 || Socorro || LINEAR || — || align=right | 3.6 km || 
|-id=735 bgcolor=#d6d6d6
| 166735 ||  || — || October 9, 2002 || Socorro || LINEAR || — || align=right | 5.6 km || 
|-id=736 bgcolor=#E9E9E9
| 166736 ||  || — || October 9, 2002 || Socorro || LINEAR || — || align=right | 2.1 km || 
|-id=737 bgcolor=#d6d6d6
| 166737 ||  || — || October 10, 2002 || Socorro || LINEAR || EOS || align=right | 3.0 km || 
|-id=738 bgcolor=#d6d6d6
| 166738 ||  || — || October 10, 2002 || Socorro || LINEAR || EOS || align=right | 3.6 km || 
|-id=739 bgcolor=#E9E9E9
| 166739 ||  || — || October 10, 2002 || Socorro || LINEAR || — || align=right | 4.8 km || 
|-id=740 bgcolor=#d6d6d6
| 166740 ||  || — || October 10, 2002 || Socorro || LINEAR || — || align=right | 4.7 km || 
|-id=741 bgcolor=#d6d6d6
| 166741 ||  || — || October 11, 2002 || Palomar || NEAT || — || align=right | 5.3 km || 
|-id=742 bgcolor=#d6d6d6
| 166742 ||  || — || October 11, 2002 || Socorro || LINEAR || — || align=right | 4.7 km || 
|-id=743 bgcolor=#d6d6d6
| 166743 ||  || — || October 11, 2002 || Socorro || LINEAR || — || align=right | 3.7 km || 
|-id=744 bgcolor=#d6d6d6
| 166744 ||  || — || October 12, 2002 || Socorro || LINEAR || — || align=right | 6.0 km || 
|-id=745 bgcolor=#d6d6d6
| 166745 Pindor ||  ||  || October 4, 2002 || Apache Point || SDSS || — || align=right | 4.5 km || 
|-id=746 bgcolor=#d6d6d6
| 166746 Marcpostman ||  ||  || October 4, 2002 || Apache Point || SDSS || — || align=right | 3.3 km || 
|-id=747 bgcolor=#d6d6d6
| 166747 Gordonrichards ||  ||  || October 4, 2002 || Apache Point || SDSS || TIR || align=right | 5.3 km || 
|-id=748 bgcolor=#d6d6d6
| 166748 Timrayschneider ||  ||  || October 5, 2002 || Apache Point || SDSS || KOR || align=right | 2.1 km || 
|-id=749 bgcolor=#d6d6d6
| 166749 Sesar ||  ||  || October 10, 2002 || Apache Point || SDSS || — || align=right | 6.5 km || 
|-id=750 bgcolor=#E9E9E9
| 166750 ||  || — || October 3, 2002 || Socorro || LINEAR || AST || align=right | 3.3 km || 
|-id=751 bgcolor=#d6d6d6
| 166751 ||  || — || October 28, 2002 || Palomar || NEAT || — || align=right | 2.8 km || 
|-id=752 bgcolor=#d6d6d6
| 166752 ||  || — || October 28, 2002 || Palomar || NEAT || — || align=right | 4.7 km || 
|-id=753 bgcolor=#E9E9E9
| 166753 ||  || — || October 28, 2002 || Palomar || NEAT || — || align=right | 4.9 km || 
|-id=754 bgcolor=#d6d6d6
| 166754 ||  || — || October 28, 2002 || Haleakala || NEAT || — || align=right | 4.8 km || 
|-id=755 bgcolor=#d6d6d6
| 166755 ||  || — || October 28, 2002 || Haleakala || NEAT || — || align=right | 5.1 km || 
|-id=756 bgcolor=#d6d6d6
| 166756 ||  || — || October 28, 2002 || Palomar || NEAT || HYG || align=right | 6.0 km || 
|-id=757 bgcolor=#fefefe
| 166757 ||  || — || October 31, 2002 || Socorro || LINEAR || H || align=right | 1.5 km || 
|-id=758 bgcolor=#d6d6d6
| 166758 ||  || — || October 30, 2002 || Haleakala || NEAT || URS || align=right | 4.0 km || 
|-id=759 bgcolor=#d6d6d6
| 166759 ||  || — || October 31, 2002 || Socorro || LINEAR || — || align=right | 3.6 km || 
|-id=760 bgcolor=#d6d6d6
| 166760 ||  || — || October 31, 2002 || Socorro || LINEAR || 628 || align=right | 4.8 km || 
|-id=761 bgcolor=#d6d6d6
| 166761 ||  || — || October 31, 2002 || Socorro || LINEAR || — || align=right | 5.6 km || 
|-id=762 bgcolor=#d6d6d6
| 166762 ||  || — || October 28, 2002 || Haleakala || NEAT || CHA || align=right | 3.5 km || 
|-id=763 bgcolor=#d6d6d6
| 166763 ||  || — || October 31, 2002 || Palomar || NEAT || — || align=right | 5.0 km || 
|-id=764 bgcolor=#d6d6d6
| 166764 ||  || — || October 31, 2002 || Anderson Mesa || LONEOS || — || align=right | 5.5 km || 
|-id=765 bgcolor=#d6d6d6
| 166765 ||  || — || October 30, 2002 || Haleakala || NEAT || HYG || align=right | 6.0 km || 
|-id=766 bgcolor=#d6d6d6
| 166766 ||  || — || October 31, 2002 || Socorro || LINEAR || — || align=right | 5.5 km || 
|-id=767 bgcolor=#d6d6d6
| 166767 ||  || — || October 31, 2002 || Kitt Peak || Spacewatch || EOS || align=right | 3.2 km || 
|-id=768 bgcolor=#d6d6d6
| 166768 || 2002 VA || — || November 1, 2002 || Pla D'Arguines || Pla D'Arguines Obs. || — || align=right | 4.8 km || 
|-id=769 bgcolor=#d6d6d6
| 166769 ||  || — || November 4, 2002 || Palomar || NEAT || — || align=right | 3.7 km || 
|-id=770 bgcolor=#d6d6d6
| 166770 ||  || — || November 1, 2002 || Palomar || NEAT || — || align=right | 4.0 km || 
|-id=771 bgcolor=#d6d6d6
| 166771 ||  || — || November 1, 2002 || Palomar || NEAT || HYG || align=right | 3.8 km || 
|-id=772 bgcolor=#d6d6d6
| 166772 ||  || — || November 5, 2002 || Socorro || LINEAR || — || align=right | 5.4 km || 
|-id=773 bgcolor=#d6d6d6
| 166773 ||  || — || November 2, 2002 || Haleakala || NEAT || — || align=right | 5.2 km || 
|-id=774 bgcolor=#d6d6d6
| 166774 ||  || — || November 4, 2002 || Anderson Mesa || LONEOS || — || align=right | 5.0 km || 
|-id=775 bgcolor=#d6d6d6
| 166775 ||  || — || November 4, 2002 || Kitt Peak || Spacewatch || — || align=right | 4.4 km || 
|-id=776 bgcolor=#d6d6d6
| 166776 ||  || — || November 4, 2002 || Kitt Peak || Spacewatch || — || align=right | 3.4 km || 
|-id=777 bgcolor=#d6d6d6
| 166777 ||  || — || November 5, 2002 || Socorro || LINEAR || EOS || align=right | 3.8 km || 
|-id=778 bgcolor=#d6d6d6
| 166778 ||  || — || November 5, 2002 || Socorro || LINEAR || VER || align=right | 5.8 km || 
|-id=779 bgcolor=#d6d6d6
| 166779 ||  || — || November 5, 2002 || Socorro || LINEAR || THM || align=right | 4.2 km || 
|-id=780 bgcolor=#d6d6d6
| 166780 ||  || — || November 5, 2002 || Socorro || LINEAR || THM || align=right | 3.5 km || 
|-id=781 bgcolor=#d6d6d6
| 166781 ||  || — || November 5, 2002 || Socorro || LINEAR || THM || align=right | 4.7 km || 
|-id=782 bgcolor=#d6d6d6
| 166782 ||  || — || November 5, 2002 || Socorro || LINEAR || THM || align=right | 4.0 km || 
|-id=783 bgcolor=#d6d6d6
| 166783 ||  || — || November 5, 2002 || Socorro || LINEAR || — || align=right | 4.4 km || 
|-id=784 bgcolor=#d6d6d6
| 166784 ||  || — || November 5, 2002 || Socorro || LINEAR || — || align=right | 6.0 km || 
|-id=785 bgcolor=#d6d6d6
| 166785 ||  || — || November 5, 2002 || Anderson Mesa || LONEOS || — || align=right | 4.7 km || 
|-id=786 bgcolor=#d6d6d6
| 166786 ||  || — || November 4, 2002 || Palomar || NEAT || HYG || align=right | 5.9 km || 
|-id=787 bgcolor=#d6d6d6
| 166787 ||  || — || November 8, 2002 || Kingsnake || J. V. McClusky || — || align=right | 7.3 km || 
|-id=788 bgcolor=#d6d6d6
| 166788 ||  || — || November 5, 2002 || Palomar || NEAT || — || align=right | 4.5 km || 
|-id=789 bgcolor=#d6d6d6
| 166789 ||  || — || November 6, 2002 || Socorro || LINEAR || — || align=right | 4.2 km || 
|-id=790 bgcolor=#d6d6d6
| 166790 ||  || — || November 4, 2002 || Haleakala || NEAT || — || align=right | 4.3 km || 
|-id=791 bgcolor=#d6d6d6
| 166791 ||  || — || November 5, 2002 || Socorro || LINEAR || — || align=right | 5.6 km || 
|-id=792 bgcolor=#d6d6d6
| 166792 ||  || — || November 5, 2002 || Palomar || NEAT || — || align=right | 3.2 km || 
|-id=793 bgcolor=#d6d6d6
| 166793 ||  || — || November 5, 2002 || Anderson Mesa || LONEOS || — || align=right | 5.1 km || 
|-id=794 bgcolor=#d6d6d6
| 166794 ||  || — || November 5, 2002 || Anderson Mesa || LONEOS || EOS || align=right | 3.6 km || 
|-id=795 bgcolor=#d6d6d6
| 166795 ||  || — || November 5, 2002 || Anderson Mesa || LONEOS || — || align=right | 6.5 km || 
|-id=796 bgcolor=#d6d6d6
| 166796 ||  || — || November 6, 2002 || Anderson Mesa || LONEOS || 628 || align=right | 3.5 km || 
|-id=797 bgcolor=#d6d6d6
| 166797 ||  || — || November 6, 2002 || Socorro || LINEAR || THM || align=right | 3.7 km || 
|-id=798 bgcolor=#d6d6d6
| 166798 ||  || — || November 6, 2002 || Socorro || LINEAR || — || align=right | 4.4 km || 
|-id=799 bgcolor=#d6d6d6
| 166799 ||  || — || November 6, 2002 || Haleakala || NEAT || — || align=right | 4.7 km || 
|-id=800 bgcolor=#d6d6d6
| 166800 ||  || — || November 6, 2002 || Haleakala || NEAT || — || align=right | 4.9 km || 
|}

166801–166900 

|-bgcolor=#d6d6d6
| 166801 ||  || — || November 6, 2002 || Haleakala || NEAT || HYG || align=right | 4.7 km || 
|-id=802 bgcolor=#d6d6d6
| 166802 ||  || — || November 6, 2002 || Haleakala || NEAT || HYG || align=right | 4.8 km || 
|-id=803 bgcolor=#d6d6d6
| 166803 ||  || — || November 6, 2002 || Haleakala || NEAT || — || align=right | 6.7 km || 
|-id=804 bgcolor=#fefefe
| 166804 ||  || — || November 7, 2002 || Anderson Mesa || LONEOS || H || align=right | 1.1 km || 
|-id=805 bgcolor=#d6d6d6
| 166805 ||  || — || November 7, 2002 || Socorro || LINEAR || — || align=right | 4.0 km || 
|-id=806 bgcolor=#d6d6d6
| 166806 ||  || — || November 7, 2002 || Socorro || LINEAR || KOR || align=right | 2.6 km || 
|-id=807 bgcolor=#d6d6d6
| 166807 ||  || — || November 7, 2002 || Socorro || LINEAR || EOS || align=right | 4.8 km || 
|-id=808 bgcolor=#d6d6d6
| 166808 ||  || — || November 7, 2002 || Socorro || LINEAR || — || align=right | 4.5 km || 
|-id=809 bgcolor=#d6d6d6
| 166809 ||  || — || November 7, 2002 || Socorro || LINEAR || — || align=right | 4.9 km || 
|-id=810 bgcolor=#d6d6d6
| 166810 ||  || — || November 7, 2002 || Socorro || LINEAR || — || align=right | 4.9 km || 
|-id=811 bgcolor=#d6d6d6
| 166811 ||  || — || November 7, 2002 || Socorro || LINEAR || — || align=right | 6.2 km || 
|-id=812 bgcolor=#d6d6d6
| 166812 ||  || — || November 7, 2002 || Socorro || LINEAR || — || align=right | 5.8 km || 
|-id=813 bgcolor=#d6d6d6
| 166813 ||  || — || November 7, 2002 || Socorro || LINEAR || — || align=right | 6.2 km || 
|-id=814 bgcolor=#d6d6d6
| 166814 ||  || — || November 8, 2002 || Socorro || LINEAR || — || align=right | 3.9 km || 
|-id=815 bgcolor=#d6d6d6
| 166815 ||  || — || November 8, 2002 || Socorro || LINEAR || HYG || align=right | 6.6 km || 
|-id=816 bgcolor=#d6d6d6
| 166816 ||  || — || November 11, 2002 || Anderson Mesa || LONEOS || — || align=right | 6.5 km || 
|-id=817 bgcolor=#d6d6d6
| 166817 ||  || — || November 11, 2002 || Kitt Peak || Spacewatch || HYG || align=right | 5.3 km || 
|-id=818 bgcolor=#d6d6d6
| 166818 ||  || — || November 11, 2002 || Socorro || LINEAR || — || align=right | 4.4 km || 
|-id=819 bgcolor=#d6d6d6
| 166819 ||  || — || November 11, 2002 || Socorro || LINEAR || TIR || align=right | 5.5 km || 
|-id=820 bgcolor=#d6d6d6
| 166820 ||  || — || November 12, 2002 || Socorro || LINEAR || — || align=right | 4.7 km || 
|-id=821 bgcolor=#d6d6d6
| 166821 ||  || — || November 12, 2002 || Socorro || LINEAR || EOS || align=right | 3.7 km || 
|-id=822 bgcolor=#d6d6d6
| 166822 ||  || — || November 11, 2002 || Anderson Mesa || LONEOS || — || align=right | 5.8 km || 
|-id=823 bgcolor=#d6d6d6
| 166823 ||  || — || November 11, 2002 || Anderson Mesa || LONEOS || EOS || align=right | 3.9 km || 
|-id=824 bgcolor=#d6d6d6
| 166824 ||  || — || November 13, 2002 || Socorro || LINEAR || Tj (2.96) || align=right | 8.4 km || 
|-id=825 bgcolor=#d6d6d6
| 166825 ||  || — || November 11, 2002 || Anderson Mesa || LONEOS || — || align=right | 6.1 km || 
|-id=826 bgcolor=#d6d6d6
| 166826 ||  || — || November 11, 2002 || Anderson Mesa || LONEOS || — || align=right | 4.0 km || 
|-id=827 bgcolor=#d6d6d6
| 166827 ||  || — || November 11, 2002 || Socorro || LINEAR || HYG || align=right | 4.9 km || 
|-id=828 bgcolor=#d6d6d6
| 166828 ||  || — || November 12, 2002 || Socorro || LINEAR || — || align=right | 5.3 km || 
|-id=829 bgcolor=#d6d6d6
| 166829 ||  || — || November 12, 2002 || Socorro || LINEAR || — || align=right | 5.3 km || 
|-id=830 bgcolor=#d6d6d6
| 166830 ||  || — || November 12, 2002 || Socorro || LINEAR || — || align=right | 5.2 km || 
|-id=831 bgcolor=#d6d6d6
| 166831 ||  || — || November 13, 2002 || Palomar || NEAT || EOS || align=right | 3.2 km || 
|-id=832 bgcolor=#d6d6d6
| 166832 ||  || — || November 13, 2002 || Palomar || NEAT || — || align=right | 4.0 km || 
|-id=833 bgcolor=#d6d6d6
| 166833 ||  || — || November 13, 2002 || Palomar || NEAT || — || align=right | 6.2 km || 
|-id=834 bgcolor=#fefefe
| 166834 ||  || — || November 13, 2002 || Socorro || LINEAR || H || align=right | 1.1 km || 
|-id=835 bgcolor=#d6d6d6
| 166835 ||  || — || November 12, 2002 || Anderson Mesa || LONEOS || — || align=right | 4.8 km || 
|-id=836 bgcolor=#d6d6d6
| 166836 ||  || — || November 12, 2002 || Socorro || LINEAR || MEL || align=right | 6.5 km || 
|-id=837 bgcolor=#d6d6d6
| 166837 ||  || — || November 12, 2002 || Palomar || NEAT || — || align=right | 5.4 km || 
|-id=838 bgcolor=#d6d6d6
| 166838 ||  || — || November 12, 2002 || Palomar || NEAT || EOS || align=right | 3.7 km || 
|-id=839 bgcolor=#d6d6d6
| 166839 ||  || — || November 13, 2002 || Palomar || NEAT || URS || align=right | 4.2 km || 
|-id=840 bgcolor=#d6d6d6
| 166840 ||  || — || November 13, 2002 || Palomar || NEAT || — || align=right | 4.5 km || 
|-id=841 bgcolor=#d6d6d6
| 166841 ||  || — || November 13, 2002 || Palomar || NEAT || — || align=right | 5.1 km || 
|-id=842 bgcolor=#d6d6d6
| 166842 ||  || — || November 12, 2002 || Socorro || LINEAR || — || align=right | 4.8 km || 
|-id=843 bgcolor=#d6d6d6
| 166843 ||  || — || November 12, 2002 || Socorro || LINEAR || — || align=right | 3.3 km || 
|-id=844 bgcolor=#d6d6d6
| 166844 ||  || — || November 14, 2002 || Socorro || LINEAR || — || align=right | 4.5 km || 
|-id=845 bgcolor=#d6d6d6
| 166845 ||  || — || November 14, 2002 || Socorro || LINEAR || EOS || align=right | 3.0 km || 
|-id=846 bgcolor=#d6d6d6
| 166846 ||  || — || November 13, 2002 || Socorro || LINEAR || EUP || align=right | 8.5 km || 
|-id=847 bgcolor=#d6d6d6
| 166847 ||  || — || November 13, 2002 || Palomar || NEAT || — || align=right | 4.9 km || 
|-id=848 bgcolor=#d6d6d6
| 166848 ||  || — || November 12, 2002 || Palomar || NEAT || — || align=right | 6.2 km || 
|-id=849 bgcolor=#d6d6d6
| 166849 ||  || — || November 24, 2002 || Palomar || NEAT || — || align=right | 5.3 km || 
|-id=850 bgcolor=#d6d6d6
| 166850 ||  || — || November 24, 2002 || Palomar || NEAT || — || align=right | 4.7 km || 
|-id=851 bgcolor=#d6d6d6
| 166851 ||  || — || November 24, 2002 || Palomar || NEAT || MEL || align=right | 7.2 km || 
|-id=852 bgcolor=#d6d6d6
| 166852 ||  || — || November 24, 2002 || Palomar || NEAT || — || align=right | 4.0 km || 
|-id=853 bgcolor=#d6d6d6
| 166853 ||  || — || November 25, 2002 || Palomar || NEAT || — || align=right | 5.8 km || 
|-id=854 bgcolor=#d6d6d6
| 166854 ||  || — || November 25, 2002 || Palomar || NEAT || VER || align=right | 4.8 km || 
|-id=855 bgcolor=#d6d6d6
| 166855 ||  || — || November 27, 2002 || Anderson Mesa || LONEOS || — || align=right | 3.4 km || 
|-id=856 bgcolor=#d6d6d6
| 166856 ||  || — || November 24, 2002 || Palomar || NEAT || — || align=right | 4.2 km || 
|-id=857 bgcolor=#d6d6d6
| 166857 || 2002 XE || — || December 1, 2002 || Emerald Lane || L. Ball || HYG || align=right | 4.3 km || 
|-id=858 bgcolor=#d6d6d6
| 166858 || 2002 XL || — || December 1, 2002 || Socorro || LINEAR || — || align=right | 4.7 km || 
|-id=859 bgcolor=#d6d6d6
| 166859 ||  || — || December 1, 2002 || Socorro || LINEAR || — || align=right | 5.3 km || 
|-id=860 bgcolor=#d6d6d6
| 166860 ||  || — || December 2, 2002 || Socorro || LINEAR || — || align=right | 7.5 km || 
|-id=861 bgcolor=#d6d6d6
| 166861 ||  || — || December 3, 2002 || Palomar || NEAT || — || align=right | 5.6 km || 
|-id=862 bgcolor=#d6d6d6
| 166862 ||  || — || December 2, 2002 || Socorro || LINEAR || — || align=right | 5.3 km || 
|-id=863 bgcolor=#d6d6d6
| 166863 ||  || — || December 5, 2002 || Palomar || NEAT || ALA || align=right | 5.3 km || 
|-id=864 bgcolor=#d6d6d6
| 166864 ||  || — || December 5, 2002 || Palomar || NEAT || — || align=right | 4.8 km || 
|-id=865 bgcolor=#d6d6d6
| 166865 ||  || — || December 6, 2002 || Socorro || LINEAR || EOS || align=right | 3.4 km || 
|-id=866 bgcolor=#d6d6d6
| 166866 ||  || — || December 6, 2002 || Socorro || LINEAR || TEL || align=right | 2.1 km || 
|-id=867 bgcolor=#d6d6d6
| 166867 ||  || — || December 6, 2002 || Socorro || LINEAR || — || align=right | 4.1 km || 
|-id=868 bgcolor=#d6d6d6
| 166868 ||  || — || December 6, 2002 || Socorro || LINEAR || EOS || align=right | 4.1 km || 
|-id=869 bgcolor=#d6d6d6
| 166869 ||  || — || December 9, 2002 || Kitt Peak || Spacewatch || — || align=right | 4.6 km || 
|-id=870 bgcolor=#d6d6d6
| 166870 ||  || — || December 10, 2002 || Socorro || LINEAR || — || align=right | 4.6 km || 
|-id=871 bgcolor=#d6d6d6
| 166871 ||  || — || December 10, 2002 || Socorro || LINEAR || LIX || align=right | 7.8 km || 
|-id=872 bgcolor=#d6d6d6
| 166872 ||  || — || December 10, 2002 || Socorro || LINEAR || — || align=right | 10 km || 
|-id=873 bgcolor=#d6d6d6
| 166873 ||  || — || December 10, 2002 || Socorro || LINEAR || — || align=right | 4.6 km || 
|-id=874 bgcolor=#fefefe
| 166874 ||  || — || December 10, 2002 || Palomar || NEAT || H || align=right | 1.1 km || 
|-id=875 bgcolor=#d6d6d6
| 166875 ||  || — || December 10, 2002 || Socorro || LINEAR || — || align=right | 4.1 km || 
|-id=876 bgcolor=#d6d6d6
| 166876 ||  || — || December 10, 2002 || Socorro || LINEAR || — || align=right | 4.3 km || 
|-id=877 bgcolor=#d6d6d6
| 166877 ||  || — || December 10, 2002 || Socorro || LINEAR || EOS || align=right | 4.4 km || 
|-id=878 bgcolor=#fefefe
| 166878 ||  || — || December 11, 2002 || Socorro || LINEAR || H || align=right data-sort-value="0.78" | 780 m || 
|-id=879 bgcolor=#d6d6d6
| 166879 ||  || — || December 11, 2002 || Palomar || NEAT || TIR || align=right | 6.8 km || 
|-id=880 bgcolor=#d6d6d6
| 166880 ||  || — || December 13, 2002 || Socorro || LINEAR || — || align=right | 5.4 km || 
|-id=881 bgcolor=#d6d6d6
| 166881 ||  || — || December 12, 2002 || Palomar || NEAT || — || align=right | 5.1 km || 
|-id=882 bgcolor=#d6d6d6
| 166882 ||  || — || December 14, 2002 || Socorro || LINEAR || THB || align=right | 6.8 km || 
|-id=883 bgcolor=#d6d6d6
| 166883 ||  || — || December 14, 2002 || Socorro || LINEAR || — || align=right | 5.9 km || 
|-id=884 bgcolor=#d6d6d6
| 166884 ||  || — || December 5, 2002 || Socorro || LINEAR || — || align=right | 4.3 km || 
|-id=885 bgcolor=#d6d6d6
| 166885 ||  || — || December 28, 2002 || Nashville || R. Clingan || — || align=right | 5.5 km || 
|-id=886 bgcolor=#d6d6d6
| 166886 Ybl ||  ||  || December 25, 2002 || Piszkéstető || K. Sárneczky || — || align=right | 4.1 km || 
|-id=887 bgcolor=#d6d6d6
| 166887 ||  || — || December 28, 2002 || Socorro || LINEAR || ALA || align=right | 6.3 km || 
|-id=888 bgcolor=#E9E9E9
| 166888 ||  || — || December 28, 2002 || Kitt Peak || Spacewatch || — || align=right | 4.0 km || 
|-id=889 bgcolor=#d6d6d6
| 166889 ||  || — || December 31, 2002 || Socorro || LINEAR || — || align=right | 5.4 km || 
|-id=890 bgcolor=#d6d6d6
| 166890 ||  || — || December 31, 2002 || Socorro || LINEAR || HYG || align=right | 5.0 km || 
|-id=891 bgcolor=#d6d6d6
| 166891 ||  || — || December 31, 2002 || Socorro || LINEAR || — || align=right | 5.5 km || 
|-id=892 bgcolor=#d6d6d6
| 166892 ||  || — || December 31, 2002 || Socorro || LINEAR || — || align=right | 4.8 km || 
|-id=893 bgcolor=#d6d6d6
| 166893 ||  || — || December 31, 2002 || Socorro || LINEAR || — || align=right | 4.1 km || 
|-id=894 bgcolor=#d6d6d6
| 166894 ||  || — || December 27, 2002 || Palomar || NEAT || — || align=right | 4.6 km || 
|-id=895 bgcolor=#d6d6d6
| 166895 ||  || — || December 31, 2002 || Socorro || LINEAR || — || align=right | 6.8 km || 
|-id=896 bgcolor=#d6d6d6
| 166896 ||  || — || January 2, 2003 || Socorro || LINEAR || EOS || align=right | 3.3 km || 
|-id=897 bgcolor=#d6d6d6
| 166897 ||  || — || January 2, 2003 || Socorro || LINEAR || — || align=right | 5.0 km || 
|-id=898 bgcolor=#fefefe
| 166898 ||  || — || January 2, 2003 || Socorro || LINEAR || H || align=right | 1.1 km || 
|-id=899 bgcolor=#d6d6d6
| 166899 ||  || — || January 1, 2003 || Kingsnake || J. V. McClusky || — || align=right | 7.4 km || 
|-id=900 bgcolor=#fefefe
| 166900 ||  || — || January 2, 2003 || Socorro || LINEAR || H || align=right | 1.1 km || 
|}

166901–167000 

|-bgcolor=#fefefe
| 166901 ||  || — || January 3, 2003 || Socorro || LINEAR || H || align=right data-sort-value="0.73" | 730 m || 
|-id=902 bgcolor=#d6d6d6
| 166902 ||  || — || January 5, 2003 || Socorro || LINEAR || — || align=right | 6.5 km || 
|-id=903 bgcolor=#d6d6d6
| 166903 ||  || — || January 5, 2003 || Socorro || LINEAR || HYG || align=right | 4.4 km || 
|-id=904 bgcolor=#d6d6d6
| 166904 ||  || — || January 7, 2003 || Socorro || LINEAR || — || align=right | 5.1 km || 
|-id=905 bgcolor=#d6d6d6
| 166905 ||  || — || January 11, 2003 || Socorro || LINEAR || — || align=right | 4.8 km || 
|-id=906 bgcolor=#d6d6d6
| 166906 ||  || — || January 12, 2003 || Anderson Mesa || LONEOS || — || align=right | 9.9 km || 
|-id=907 bgcolor=#fefefe
| 166907 ||  || — || January 13, 2003 || Socorro || LINEAR || H || align=right data-sort-value="0.85" | 850 m || 
|-id=908 bgcolor=#fefefe
| 166908 ||  || — || January 13, 2003 || Socorro || LINEAR || H || align=right data-sort-value="0.96" | 960 m || 
|-id=909 bgcolor=#d6d6d6
| 166909 ||  || — || January 1, 2003 || Socorro || LINEAR || — || align=right | 5.6 km || 
|-id=910 bgcolor=#fefefe
| 166910 ||  || — || January 30, 2003 || Socorro || LINEAR || H || align=right | 1.6 km || 
|-id=911 bgcolor=#d6d6d6
| 166911 ||  || — || January 26, 2003 || Haleakala || NEAT || THM || align=right | 4.2 km || 
|-id=912 bgcolor=#d6d6d6
| 166912 ||  || — || January 27, 2003 || Haleakala || NEAT || — || align=right | 3.6 km || 
|-id=913 bgcolor=#fefefe
| 166913 ||  || — || January 31, 2003 || Socorro || LINEAR || H || align=right data-sort-value="0.90" | 900 m || 
|-id=914 bgcolor=#d6d6d6
| 166914 ||  || — || February 1, 2003 || Palomar || NEAT || — || align=right | 8.0 km || 
|-id=915 bgcolor=#fefefe
| 166915 ||  || — || February 28, 2003 || Socorro || LINEAR || H || align=right | 1.0 km || 
|-id=916 bgcolor=#fefefe
| 166916 ||  || — || March 5, 2003 || Socorro || LINEAR || — || align=right | 2.3 km || 
|-id=917 bgcolor=#fefefe
| 166917 ||  || — || March 7, 2003 || Socorro || LINEAR || — || align=right | 1.5 km || 
|-id=918 bgcolor=#fefefe
| 166918 ||  || — || March 24, 2003 || Kitt Peak || Spacewatch || — || align=right | 1.0 km || 
|-id=919 bgcolor=#fefefe
| 166919 ||  || — || March 24, 2003 || Kitt Peak || Spacewatch || — || align=right data-sort-value="0.77" | 770 m || 
|-id=920 bgcolor=#fefefe
| 166920 ||  || — || March 24, 2003 || Kitt Peak || Spacewatch || — || align=right data-sort-value="0.89" | 890 m || 
|-id=921 bgcolor=#fefefe
| 166921 ||  || — || March 27, 2003 || Palomar || NEAT || — || align=right | 1.1 km || 
|-id=922 bgcolor=#fefefe
| 166922 ||  || — || March 28, 2003 || Kitt Peak || Spacewatch || FLO || align=right data-sort-value="0.92" | 920 m || 
|-id=923 bgcolor=#fefefe
| 166923 ||  || — || March 29, 2003 || Anderson Mesa || LONEOS || — || align=right | 1.2 km || 
|-id=924 bgcolor=#fefefe
| 166924 ||  || — || March 24, 2003 || Kitt Peak || Spacewatch || — || align=right data-sort-value="0.78" | 780 m || 
|-id=925 bgcolor=#fefefe
| 166925 ||  || — || March 27, 2003 || Palomar || NEAT || — || align=right | 1.1 km || 
|-id=926 bgcolor=#fefefe
| 166926 ||  || — || April 1, 2003 || Socorro || LINEAR || — || align=right data-sort-value="0.98" | 980 m || 
|-id=927 bgcolor=#fefefe
| 166927 ||  || — || April 3, 2003 || Anderson Mesa || LONEOS || — || align=right | 1.4 km || 
|-id=928 bgcolor=#fefefe
| 166928 ||  || — || April 1, 2003 || Haleakala || NEAT || — || align=right data-sort-value="0.99" | 990 m || 
|-id=929 bgcolor=#fefefe
| 166929 ||  || — || April 9, 2003 || Socorro || LINEAR || — || align=right | 1.9 km || 
|-id=930 bgcolor=#fefefe
| 166930 ||  || — || April 8, 2003 || Socorro || LINEAR || — || align=right | 1.5 km || 
|-id=931 bgcolor=#fefefe
| 166931 || 2003 HQ || — || April 20, 2003 || Haleakala || NEAT || — || align=right | 1.1 km || 
|-id=932 bgcolor=#fefefe
| 166932 ||  || — || April 25, 2003 || Kitt Peak || Spacewatch || — || align=right | 1.0 km || 
|-id=933 bgcolor=#fefefe
| 166933 ||  || — || April 24, 2003 || Kitt Peak || Spacewatch || FLO || align=right | 1.1 km || 
|-id=934 bgcolor=#fefefe
| 166934 ||  || — || April 24, 2003 || Anderson Mesa || LONEOS || — || align=right | 1.2 km || 
|-id=935 bgcolor=#fefefe
| 166935 ||  || — || April 26, 2003 || Haleakala || NEAT || — || align=right | 1.2 km || 
|-id=936 bgcolor=#fefefe
| 166936 ||  || — || April 26, 2003 || Haleakala || NEAT || NYS || align=right | 1.3 km || 
|-id=937 bgcolor=#fefefe
| 166937 ||  || — || April 29, 2003 || Socorro || LINEAR || — || align=right | 1.2 km || 
|-id=938 bgcolor=#fefefe
| 166938 ||  || — || April 29, 2003 || Socorro || LINEAR || — || align=right | 1.1 km || 
|-id=939 bgcolor=#fefefe
| 166939 ||  || — || April 29, 2003 || Socorro || LINEAR || NYS || align=right | 2.7 km || 
|-id=940 bgcolor=#fefefe
| 166940 ||  || — || April 28, 2003 || Haleakala || NEAT || — || align=right | 1.7 km || 
|-id=941 bgcolor=#fefefe
| 166941 ||  || — || April 28, 2003 || Socorro || LINEAR || FLO || align=right | 1.5 km || 
|-id=942 bgcolor=#fefefe
| 166942 ||  || — || April 30, 2003 || Socorro || LINEAR || — || align=right | 1.5 km || 
|-id=943 bgcolor=#fefefe
| 166943 ||  || — || April 29, 2003 || Socorro || LINEAR || — || align=right data-sort-value="0.87" | 870 m || 
|-id=944 bgcolor=#fefefe
| 166944 Seton ||  ||  || April 25, 2003 || Goodricke-Pigott || P. Kumar || — || align=right | 1.6 km || 
|-id=945 bgcolor=#fefefe
| 166945 ||  || — || April 24, 2003 || Haleakala || NEAT || FLO || align=right data-sort-value="0.87" | 870 m || 
|-id=946 bgcolor=#fefefe
| 166946 ||  || — || May 2, 2003 || Socorro || LINEAR || — || align=right | 1.1 km || 
|-id=947 bgcolor=#fefefe
| 166947 ||  || — || May 2, 2003 || Socorro || LINEAR || — || align=right | 1.4 km || 
|-id=948 bgcolor=#fefefe
| 166948 ||  || — || May 2, 2003 || Kitt Peak || Spacewatch || — || align=right data-sort-value="0.97" | 970 m || 
|-id=949 bgcolor=#fefefe
| 166949 ||  || — || May 5, 2003 || Catalina || CSS || — || align=right | 1.1 km || 
|-id=950 bgcolor=#fefefe
| 166950 ||  || — || May 8, 2003 || Haleakala || NEAT || — || align=right | 1.2 km || 
|-id=951 bgcolor=#fefefe
| 166951 ||  || — || May 23, 2003 || Reedy Creek || J. Broughton || — || align=right | 2.3 km || 
|-id=952 bgcolor=#fefefe
| 166952 ||  || — || May 26, 2003 || Haleakala || NEAT || NYS || align=right data-sort-value="0.97" | 970 m || 
|-id=953 bgcolor=#fefefe
| 166953 ||  || — || May 25, 2003 || Kitt Peak || Spacewatch || — || align=right | 1.4 km || 
|-id=954 bgcolor=#fefefe
| 166954 ||  || — || June 2, 2003 || Socorro || LINEAR || PHO || align=right | 2.2 km || 
|-id=955 bgcolor=#fefefe
| 166955 ||  || — || June 26, 2003 || Socorro || LINEAR || — || align=right | 2.2 km || 
|-id=956 bgcolor=#fefefe
| 166956 ||  || — || June 27, 2003 || Socorro || LINEAR || — || align=right | 1.4 km || 
|-id=957 bgcolor=#fefefe
| 166957 ||  || — || June 28, 2003 || Socorro || LINEAR || — || align=right | 1.6 km || 
|-id=958 bgcolor=#fefefe
| 166958 ||  || — || June 28, 2003 || Socorro || LINEAR || — || align=right | 1.2 km || 
|-id=959 bgcolor=#fefefe
| 166959 ||  || — || June 29, 2003 || Socorro || LINEAR || — || align=right | 3.6 km || 
|-id=960 bgcolor=#fefefe
| 166960 || 2003 NS || — || July 1, 2003 || Haleakala || NEAT || — || align=right | 2.8 km || 
|-id=961 bgcolor=#fefefe
| 166961 ||  || — || July 2, 2003 || Socorro || LINEAR || — || align=right | 2.7 km || 
|-id=962 bgcolor=#fefefe
| 166962 ||  || — || July 1, 2003 || Socorro || LINEAR || — || align=right | 1.1 km || 
|-id=963 bgcolor=#fefefe
| 166963 ||  || — || July 3, 2003 || Reedy Creek || J. Broughton || — || align=right | 1.1 km || 
|-id=964 bgcolor=#fefefe
| 166964 ||  || — || July 4, 2003 || Socorro || LINEAR || V || align=right | 1.1 km || 
|-id=965 bgcolor=#fefefe
| 166965 ||  || — || July 8, 2003 || Palomar || NEAT || — || align=right | 1.6 km || 
|-id=966 bgcolor=#fefefe
| 166966 ||  || — || July 21, 2003 || Campo Imperatore || CINEOS || NYS || align=right | 1.1 km || 
|-id=967 bgcolor=#fefefe
| 166967 ||  || — || July 22, 2003 || Haleakala || NEAT || V || align=right | 1.2 km || 
|-id=968 bgcolor=#fefefe
| 166968 ||  || — || July 22, 2003 || Haleakala || NEAT || — || align=right | 1.4 km || 
|-id=969 bgcolor=#fefefe
| 166969 ||  || — || July 22, 2003 || Campo Imperatore || CINEOS || — || align=right | 1.1 km || 
|-id=970 bgcolor=#fefefe
| 166970 ||  || — || July 22, 2003 || Campo Imperatore || CINEOS || MAS || align=right | 1.3 km || 
|-id=971 bgcolor=#fefefe
| 166971 ||  || — || July 21, 2003 || Campo Imperatore || CINEOS || ERI || align=right | 2.7 km || 
|-id=972 bgcolor=#fefefe
| 166972 ||  || — || July 22, 2003 || Campo Imperatore || CINEOS || — || align=right | 1.2 km || 
|-id=973 bgcolor=#fefefe
| 166973 ||  || — || July 24, 2003 || Reedy Creek || J. Broughton || — || align=right | 3.1 km || 
|-id=974 bgcolor=#fefefe
| 166974 ||  || — || July 24, 2003 || Majorca || OAM Obs. || V || align=right | 1.1 km || 
|-id=975 bgcolor=#fefefe
| 166975 ||  || — || July 25, 2003 || Socorro || LINEAR || MAS || align=right | 1.4 km || 
|-id=976 bgcolor=#fefefe
| 166976 ||  || — || July 27, 2003 || Reedy Creek || J. Broughton || — || align=right | 1.4 km || 
|-id=977 bgcolor=#fefefe
| 166977 ||  || — || July 22, 2003 || Palomar || NEAT || — || align=right | 1.7 km || 
|-id=978 bgcolor=#fefefe
| 166978 ||  || — || July 28, 2003 || Reedy Creek || J. Broughton || — || align=right | 1.4 km || 
|-id=979 bgcolor=#fefefe
| 166979 ||  || — || July 22, 2003 || Palomar || NEAT || LCI || align=right | 1.5 km || 
|-id=980 bgcolor=#fefefe
| 166980 ||  || — || July 23, 2003 || Socorro || LINEAR || EUT || align=right | 1.2 km || 
|-id=981 bgcolor=#fefefe
| 166981 ||  || — || July 30, 2003 || Palomar || NEAT || — || align=right | 1.4 km || 
|-id=982 bgcolor=#fefefe
| 166982 ||  || — || July 28, 2003 || Campo Imperatore || CINEOS || — || align=right data-sort-value="0.87" | 870 m || 
|-id=983 bgcolor=#fefefe
| 166983 ||  || — || July 22, 2003 || Haleakala || NEAT || — || align=right | 1.5 km || 
|-id=984 bgcolor=#fefefe
| 166984 ||  || — || July 24, 2003 || Palomar || NEAT || NYS || align=right | 1.0 km || 
|-id=985 bgcolor=#fefefe
| 166985 ||  || — || July 24, 2003 || Palomar || NEAT || — || align=right | 2.8 km || 
|-id=986 bgcolor=#fefefe
| 166986 ||  || — || July 24, 2003 || Palomar || NEAT || MAS || align=right | 1.3 km || 
|-id=987 bgcolor=#fefefe
| 166987 ||  || — || July 24, 2003 || Palomar || NEAT || — || align=right | 3.0 km || 
|-id=988 bgcolor=#fefefe
| 166988 ||  || — || July 24, 2003 || Palomar || NEAT || — || align=right | 1.1 km || 
|-id=989 bgcolor=#fefefe
| 166989 ||  || — || July 24, 2003 || Palomar || NEAT || NYS || align=right | 1.1 km || 
|-id=990 bgcolor=#E9E9E9
| 166990 ||  || — || July 24, 2003 || Palomar || NEAT || — || align=right | 3.7 km || 
|-id=991 bgcolor=#fefefe
| 166991 || 2003 PY || — || August 1, 2003 || Socorro || LINEAR || — || align=right | 1.8 km || 
|-id=992 bgcolor=#fefefe
| 166992 ||  || — || August 1, 2003 || Haleakala || NEAT || NYS || align=right | 1.0 km || 
|-id=993 bgcolor=#fefefe
| 166993 ||  || — || August 1, 2003 || Haleakala || NEAT || — || align=right | 1.9 km || 
|-id=994 bgcolor=#E9E9E9
| 166994 ||  || — || August 2, 2003 || Haleakala || NEAT || — || align=right | 1.7 km || 
|-id=995 bgcolor=#fefefe
| 166995 ||  || — || August 2, 2003 || Haleakala || NEAT || — || align=right | 2.2 km || 
|-id=996 bgcolor=#fefefe
| 166996 ||  || — || August 2, 2003 || Haleakala || NEAT || — || align=right | 2.3 km || 
|-id=997 bgcolor=#fefefe
| 166997 ||  || — || August 4, 2003 || Socorro || LINEAR || — || align=right | 1.4 km || 
|-id=998 bgcolor=#fefefe
| 166998 ||  || — || August 4, 2003 || Socorro || LINEAR || — || align=right | 1.8 km || 
|-id=999 bgcolor=#fefefe
| 166999 ||  || — || August 1, 2003 || Socorro || LINEAR || — || align=right | 1.2 km || 
|-id=000 bgcolor=#fefefe
| 167000 ||  || — || August 1, 2003 || Socorro || LINEAR || FLO || align=right data-sort-value="0.91" | 910 m || 
|}

References

External links 
 Discovery Circumstances: Numbered Minor Planets (165001)–(170000) (IAU Minor Planet Center)

0166